= List of Aizoaceae of South Africa =

List of flowering plants in the family Aizoaceae recorded from South Africa

Aizoaceae Martynov, nom. cons. (fig-marigold family) is a large family of dicotyledonous flowering plants in the order Caryophyllales containing 135 currently accepted genera and about 1800 species. They are commonly known as ice plants, carpet weeds or vygies.

23,420 species of vascular plant have been recorded in South Africa, making it the sixth most species-rich country in the world and the most species-rich country on the African continent. Of these, 153 species are considered to be threatened. Nine biomes have been described in South Africa: Fynbos, Succulent Karoo, desert, Nama Karoo, grassland, savanna, Albany thickets, the Indian Ocean coastal belt, and forests.

The 2018 South African National Biodiversity Institute's National Biodiversity Assessment plant checklist lists 35,130 taxa in the phyla Anthocerotophyta (hornworts (6)), Anthophyta (flowering plants (33534)), Bryophyta (mosses (685)), Cycadophyta (cycads (42)), Lycopodiophyta (Lycophytes(45)), Marchantiophyta (liverworts (376)), Pinophyta (conifers (33)), and Pteridophyta (cryptogams (408)).

169 genera are represented in the literature. Listed taxa include species, subspecies, varieties, and forms as recorded, some of which have subsequently been allocated to other taxa as synonyms, in which cases the accepted taxon is appended to the listing. Multiple entries under alternative names reflect taxonomic revision over time.

== Acrodon ==
Genus Acrodon:

- Acrodon bellidiflorus (L.) N.E.Br. endemic
- Acrodon caespitosus H.E.K.Hartmann, endemic
- Acrodon deminutus Klak, endemic
  - Acrodon duplessiae (L.Bolus) Glen, accepted as Acrodon bellidiflorus (L.) N.E.Br. present
  - Acrodon leptophyll (L.Bolus) Glen, accepted as Acrodon subulatus (Mill.) N.E.Br. present
- Acrodon parvifolius R.du Plessis, endemic
- Acrodon purpureostylus (L.Bolus) Burgoyne, endemic
- Acrodon quarcicola H.E.K.Hartmann, endemic
- Acrodon subulatus (Mill.) N.E.Br. endemic

== Acrosanthes ==
Genus Acrosanthes:

- Acrosanthes anceps (Thunb.) Sond. endemic
- Acrosanthes angustifolia Eckl. & Zeyh. endemic
- Acrosanthes decandra Fenzl, accepted as Acrosanthes humifusa (Thunb.) Sond. indigenous
- Acrosanthes fistulosa Eckl. & Zeyh. accepted as Acrosanthes anceps (Thunb.) Sond. indigenous
- Acrosanthes humifusa (Thunb.) Sond. endemic
- Acrosanthes microphylla Adamson, endemic
- Acrosanthes parviflora J.C.Manning & Goldblatt, endemic
- Acrosanthes teretifolia Eckl. & Zeyh. endemic

== Aethephyllum ==
Genus Aethephyllum:

- Aethephyllum pinnatifidum (L.f.) N.E.Br. endemic

== Aizoanthemum ==
Genus Aizoanthemum:

- Aizoanthemum membrumconnectens Dinter ex Friedrich, accepted as Aizoanthemum rehmannii (Schinz) H.E.K.Hartmann

== Aizoon ==
Genus Aizoon:

- Aizoon asbestinum Schltr. indigenous
- Aizoon burchellii N.E.Br. indigenous
- Aizoon canariense L. indigenous
- Aizoon glinoides L.f. endemic
- Aizoon karooicum Compton, endemic
- Aizoon paniculatum L. endemic
- Aizoon rigidum L.f. endemic
  - Aizoon rigidum L.f. var. angustifolium Sond. accepted as Aizoon rigidum L.f. present
  - Aizoon rigidum L.f. var. villosum Adamson, accepted as Aizoon rigidum L.f. present
- Aizoon sarmentosum L.f. endemic
- Aizoon schellenbergii Adamson, indigenous
- Aizoon zeyheri Sond. endemic

== Aloinopsis ==
Genus Aloinopsis:

- Aloinopsis acuta L.Bolus, endemic
- Aloinopsis hilmarii (L.Bolus) L.Bolus, accepted as Deilanthe hilmarii (L.Bolus) H.E.K.Hartmann, present
- Aloinopsis jamesii L.Bolus, accepted as Aloinopsis rubrolineata (N.E.Br.) Schwantes, present
- Aloinopsis lodewykii L.Bolus, accepted as Aloinopsis luckhoffii (L.Bolus) L.Bolus, present
- Aloinopsis loganii (L.Bolus) L.Bolus, endemic
- Aloinopsis luckhoffii (L.Bolus) L.Bolus, endemic
- Aloinopsis malherbei (L.Bolus) L.Bolus, endemic
- Aloinopsis orpenii (N.E.Br.) L.Bolus, accepted as Prepodesma orpenii (N.E.Br.) N.E.Br. present
- Aloinopsis peersii (L.Bolus) L.Bolus, accepted as Deilanthe peersii (L.Bolus) N.E.Br. present
- Aloinopsis rosulata (Kensit) Schwantes, endemic
- Aloinopsis rubrolineata (N.E.Br.) Schwantes, endemic
- Aloinopsis schooneesii L.Bolus, endemic
  - Aloinopsis schooneesii L.Bolus var. acutipetala L.Bolus, accepted as Aloinopsis schooneesii L.Bolus, present
  - Aloinopsis schooneesii L.Bolus var. willowmorensis L.Bolus, accepted as Aloinopsis schooneesii L.Bolus, present
- Aloinopsis setifera (L.Bolus) L.Bolus, accepted as Aloinopsis luckhoffii (L.Bolus) L.Bolus, present
- Aloinopsis spathulata (Thunb.) L.Bolus, endemic
- Aloinopsis thudichumii L.Bolus, accepted as Deilanthe thudichumii (L.Bolus) S.A.Hammer, present
- Aloinopsis villetii (L.Bolus) L.Bolus, accepted as Aloinopsis luckhoffii (L.Bolus) L.Bolus, present

== Amoebophyllum ==
Genus Amoebophyllum:

- Amoebophyllum angustum N.E.Br. accepted as Mesembryanthemum vanheerdei (L.Bolus) Klak, indigenous
- Amoebophyllum guerichianum (Pax) N.E.Br. accepted as Mesembryanthemum guerichianum Pax, indigenous
- Amoebophyllum rangei N.E.Br. accepted as Mesembryanthemum oculatum N.E.Br. indigenous
- Amoebophyllum roseum L.Bolus, accepted as Mesembryanthemum vanheerdei (L.Bolus) Klak, indigenous

== Amphibolia ==
Genus Amphibolia:

- Amphibolia gydouwensis (L.Bolus) L.Bolus ex Toelken & Jessop, accepted as Phiambolia incumbens (L.Bolus) Klak, present
- Amphibolia hallii (L.Bolus) L.Bolus, accepted as Phiambolia hallii (L.Bolus) Klak, present
- Amphibolia hutchinsonii (L.Bolus) H.E.K.Hartmann, accepted as Amphibolia laevis (Aiton) H.E.K.Hartmann, present
- Amphibolia laevis (Aiton) H.E.K.Hartmann, endemic
- Amphibolia littlewoodii (L.Bolus) L.Bolus ex Toelken & Jessop, accepted as Ruschia mutata G.D.Rowley, present
- Amphibolia maritima L.Bolus ex Toelken & Jessop, accepted as Amphibolia laevis (Aiton) H.E.K.Hartmann, present
- Amphibolia obscura H.E.K.Hartmann, indigenous
- Amphibolia rupis-arcuatae (Dinter) H.E.K.Hartmann, indigenous
- Amphibolia stayneri L.Bolus ex Toelken & Jessop, accepted as Phiambolia littlewoodii (L.Bolus) Klak, present
- Amphibolia succulenta (L.Bolus) H.E.K.Hartmann, indigenous

== Antegibbaeum ==
Genus Antegibbaeum:

- Antegibbaeum fissoides (Haw.) Schwantes ex C.Weber, endemic

== Antimima ==
Genus Antimima:

- Antimima addita (L.Bolus) H.E.K.Hartmann, endemic
- Antimima alborubra (L.Bolus) Dehn, endemic
- Antimima amoena (Schwantes) H.E.K.Hartmann, endemic
- Antimima androsacea (Marloth & Schwantes) H.E.K.Hartmann, endemic
- Antimima aristulata (Sond.) Chess. & Gideon F.Sm. endemic
- Antimima biformis (N.E.Br.) H.E.K.Hartmann, endemic
- Antimima bina (L.Bolus) H.E.K.Hartmann, accepted as Antimima viatorum (L.Bolus) Klak, present
- Antimima bracteata (L.Bolus) H.E.K.Hartmann, endemic
- Antimima brevicarpa (L.Bolus) H.E.K.Hartmann, endemic
- Antimima brevicollis (N.E.Br.) H.E.K.Hartmann, endemic
- Antimima compacta (L.Bolus) H.E.K.Hartmann, endemic
- Antimima compressa (L.Bolus) H.E.K.Hartmann, endemic
- Antimima concinna (L.Bolus) H.E.K.Hartmann, accepted as Antimima aristulata (Sond.) Chess. & Gideon F.Sm. endemic
- Antimima condensa (N.E.Br.) H.E.K.Hartmann, endemic
- Antimima crassifolia (L.Bolus) H.E.K.Hartmann, accepted as Antimima paripetala (L.Bolus) Klak, endemic
- Antimima dasyphylla (Schltr.) H.E.K.Hartmann, endemic
- Antimima defecta (L.Bolus) H.E.K.Hartmann, endemic
- Antimima dekenahi (N.E.Br.) H.E.K.Hartmann, endemic
- Antimima distans (L.Bolus) H.E.K.Hartmann, endemic
- Antimima dualis (N.E.Br.) N.E.Br. endemic
- Antimima elevata (L.Bolus) H.E.K.Hartmann, endemic
- Antimima emarcescens (L.Bolus) H.E.K.Hartmann, endemic
- Antimima erosa (L.Bolus) H.E.K.Hartmann, endemic
- Antimima evoluta (N.E.Br.) H.E.K.Hartmann, endemic
- Antimima excedens (L.Bolus) Klak, endemic
- Antimima exsurgens (L.Bolus) H.E.K.Hartmann, endemic
- Antimima fenestrata (L.Bolus) H.E.K.Hartmann, endemic
- Antimima fergusoniae (L.Bolus) H.E.K.Hartmann, endemic
- Antimima gracillima (L.Bolus) H.E.K.Hartmann, endemic
- Antimima granitica (L.Bolus) H.E.K.Hartmann, endemic
- Antimima hallii (L.Bolus) H.E.K.Hartmann, endemic
- Antimima hamatilis (L.Bolus) H.E.K.Hartmann, endemic
- Antimima hantamensis (Engl.) H.E.K.Hartmann & Stuber, endemic
- Antimima herrei (Schwantes) H.E.K.Hartmann, endemic
- Antimima hexamera (L.Bolus) Klak, accepted as Antimima paripetala (L.Bolus) Klak, present
- Antimima insidens (L.Bolus) Chess. endemic
- Antimima intervallaris (L.Bolus) H.E.K.Hartmann, endemic
- Antimima ivori (N.E.Br.) H.E.K.Hartmann, endemic
- Antimima karroidea (L.Bolus) H.E.K.Hartmann, endemic
- Antimima klaverensis (L.Bolus) H.E.K.Hartmann, endemic
- Antimima koekenaapensis (L.Bolus) H.E.K.Hartmann, endemic
- Antimima komkansica (L.Bolus) H.E.K.Hartmann, endemic
- Antimima lawsonii (L.Bolus) H.E.K.Hartmann, endemic
- Antimima leipoldtii (L.Bolus) H.E.K.Hartmann, endemic
- Antimima leucanthera (L.Bolus) H.E.K.Hartmann, endemic
- Antimima limbata (N.E.Br.) H.E.K.Hartmann, accepted as Antimima granitica (L.Bolus) H.E.K.Hartmann, endemic
- Antimima lodewykii (L.Bolus) H.E.K.Hartmann, endemic
- Antimima loganii (L.Bolus) H.E.K.Hartmann, endemic
- Antimima lokenbergensis (L.Bolus) H.E.K.Hartmann, endemic
- Antimima longipes (L.Bolus) Dehn, endemic
- Antimima luckhoffii (L.Bolus) H.E.K.Hartmann, endemic
- Antimima maleolens (L.Bolus) H.E.K.Hartmann, endemic
- Antimima maxwellii (L.Bolus) H.E.K.Hartmann, endemic
- Antimima menniei (L.Bolus) H.E.K.Hartmann, accepted as Antimima aristulata (Sond.) Chess. & Gideon F.Sm. endemic
- Antimima mesklipensis (L.Bolus) H.E.K.Hartmann, endemic
- Antimima meyerae (Schwantes) H.E.K.Hartmann, endemic
- Antimima microphylla (Haw.) Dehn, endemic
- Antimima minima (Tischer) H.E.K.Hartmann, endemic
- Antimima minutifolia (L.Bolus) H.E.K.Hartmann, endemic
- Antimima mucronata (Haw.) H.E.K.Hartmann, endemic
- Antimima mutica (L.Bolus) H.E.K.Hartmann, endemic
- Antimima nobilis (Schwantes) H.E.K.Hartmann, endemic
- Antimima nordenstamii (L.Bolus) H.E.K.Hartmann, endemic
- Antimima oviformis (L.Bolus) H.E.K.Hartmann, endemic
- Antimima papillata (L.Bolus) H.E.K.Hartmann, endemic
- Antimima paripetala (L.Bolus) Klak, indigenous
- Antimima paucifolia (L.Bolus) H.E.K.Hartmann, endemic
- Antimima pauper (L.Bolus) H.E.K.Hartmann, endemic
- Antimima peersii (L.Bolus) H.E.K.Hartmann, endemic
- Antimima persistens (L.Bolus) H.E.K.Hartmann, endemic
- Antimima pilosula (L.Bolus) H.E.K.Hartmann, endemic
- Antimima piscodora (L.Bolus) H.E.K.Hartmann, endemic
- Antimima prolongata (L.Bolus) H.E.K.Hartmann, endemic
- Antimima propinqua (N.E.Br.) H.E.K.Hartmann, endemic
- Antimima prostrata (L.Bolus) H.E.K.Hartmann, endemic
- Antimima pumila (Fedde & C.Schust.) H.E.K.Hartmann, endemic
- Antimima pusilla (Schwantes) H.E.K.Hartmann, endemic
- Antimima pygmaea (Haw.) H.E.K.Hartmann, endemic
- Antimima radicans (L.Bolus) Klak, endemic
- Antimima roseola (N.E.Br.) H.E.K.Hartmann, endemic
- Antimima saturata (L.Bolus) H.E.K.Hartmann, endemic
- Antimima saxicola (L.Bolus) H.E.K.Hartmann, endemic
- Antimima schlechteri (Schwantes) H.E.K.Hartmann, endemic
- Antimima simulans (L.Bolus) H.E.K.Hartmann, endemic
- Antimima sobrina (N.E.Br.) H.E.K.Hartmann, endemic
- Antimima solida (L.Bolus) H.E.K.Hartmann, endemic
- Antimima stayneri (L.Bolus) H.E.K.Hartmann, endemic
- Antimima stokoei (L.Bolus) H.E.K.Hartmann, endemic
- Antimima subtruncata (L.Bolus) H.E.K.Hartmann, endemic
- Antimima triquetra (L.Bolus) H.E.K.Hartmann, endemic
- Antimima tuberculosa (L.Bolus) H.E.K.Hartmann, endemic
- Antimima turneriana (L.Bolus) H.E.K.Hartmann, endemic
- Antimima vanzylii (L.Bolus) H.E.K.Hartmann, endemic
- Antimima varians (L.Bolus) H.E.K.Hartmann, endemic
- Antimima ventricosa (L.Bolus) H.E.K.Hartmann, endemic
- Antimima verruculosa (L.Bolus) H.E.K.Hartmann, endemic
- Antimima viatorum (L.Bolus) Klak, endemic
- Antimima virgata (Haw.) Dehn, accepted as Ruschia virgata (Haw.) L.Bolus, present
- Antimima watermeyeri (L.Bolus) H.E.K.Hartmann, endemic
- Antimima wittebergensis (L.Bolus) H.E.K.Hartmann, endemic

== Anysocalyx ==
Genus Anysocalyx:

- Anysocalyx vaginatus (L.Bolus) L.Bolus, accepted as Jacobsenia vaginata (L.Bolus) Ihlenf. present

== Apatesia ==
Genus Apatesia:

- Apatesia helianthoides (Aiton) N.E.Br. endemic
- Apatesia pillansii N.E.Br. endemic
- Apatesia sabulosa (Thunb.) L.Bolus, endemic

== Aptenia ==
Genus Aptenia: (synonym of Mesembryanthemum)

- Aptenia cordifolia (L.f.) Schwantes, accepted as Mesembryanthemum cordifolium L.f. endemic
- Aptenia geniculiflora (L.) Bittrich ex Gerbaulet, accepted as Mesembryanthemum geniculiflorum L. endemic
- Aptenia haeckeliana (A.Berger) Bittrich ex Gerbaulet, accepted as Mesembryanthemum haeckelianum A.Berger, endemic
- Aptenia lancifolia L.Bolus, accepted as Mesembryanthemum lancifolium (L.Bolus) Klak, endemic

== Arenifera ==
Genus Arenifera:

- Arenifera pillansii (L.Bolus) Herre, endemic
- Arenifera pungens H.E.K.Hartmann, endemic
- Arenifera spinescens (L.Bolus) H.E.K.Hartmann, endemic
- Arenifera stylosa (L.Bolus) H.E.K.Hartmann, endemic

== Argeta ==
Genus Argeta:

- Argeta petrense N.E.Br. accepted as Gibbaeum petrense (N.E.Br.) Tischer, indigenous

== Argyroderma ==
Genus Argyroderma:

- Argyroderma congregatum L.Bolus, endemic
- Argyroderma crateriforme (L.Bolus) N.E.Br. endemic
- Argyroderma delaetii C.A.Maass, endemic
- Argyroderma fissum (Haw.) L.Bolus, endemic
- Argyroderma framesii L.Bolus, indigenous
  - Argyroderma framesii L.Bolus subsp. framesii, endemic
  - Argyroderma framesii L.Bolus subsp. hallii (L.Bolus) H.E.K.Hartmann, endemic
- Argyroderma patens L.Bolus, endemic
- Argyroderma pearsonii (N.E.Br.) Schwantes, endemic
- Argyroderma ringens L.Bolus, endemic
- Argyroderma subalbum (N.E.Br.) N.E.Br. endemic
- Argyroderma testiculare (Aiton) N.E.Br. endemic
- Argyroderma theartii Van Jaarsv. endemic

== Aridaria ==
Genus Aridaria:

- Aridaria abbreviata L.Bolus, accepted as Mesembryanthemum lilliputanum Klak, indigenous
- Aridaria albertensis L.Bolus, accepted as Mesembryanthemum oubergense (L.Bolus) Klak, indigenous
- Aridaria anguinea L.Bolus, accepted as Mesembryanthemum oculatum N.E.Br. indigenous
- Aridaria arenicola L.Bolus, accepted as Mesembryanthemum oculatum N.E.Br. indigenous
- Aridaria aurea (Thunb.) L.Bolus, accepted as Mesembryanthemum nitidum Haw. indigenous
- Aridaria ausana (Dinter & A.Berger) Dinter & Schwantes, accepted as Mesembryanthemum tetragonum Thunb. present
- Aridaria barkerae L.Bolus, accepted as Mesembryanthemum noctiflorum L. subsp. defoliatum (Haw.) Klak, present
- Aridaria beaufortensis L.Bolus, accepted as Mesembryanthemum noctiflorum L. subsp. stramineum (Haw.) Klak, present
- Aridaria brevicarpa L.Bolus, accepted as Mesembryanthemum brevicarpum (L.Bolus) Klak, indigenous
- Aridaria brevifolia L.Bolus, accepted as Mesembryanthemum splendens L. subsp. splendens, present
- Aridaria brevisepala L.Bolus, accepted as Mesembryanthemum spinuliferum Haw. indigenous
- Aridaria canaliculata (Haw.) Friedrich, accepted as Mesembryanthemum canaliculatum Haw. indigenous
- Aridaria caudata (L.Bolus) L.Bolus, accepted as Mesembryanthemum caudatum L.Bolus, indigenous
- Aridaria congesta L.Bolus, accepted as Mesembryanthemum flavidum Klak, present
- Aridaria decidua L.Bolus, accepted as Mesembryanthemum deciduum (L.Bolus) Klak, indigenous
- Aridaria decurvata L.Bolus, accepted as Mesembryanthemum decurvatum (L.Bolus) Klak, indigenous
- Aridaria defoliata (Haw.) Schwantes, accepted as Mesembryanthemum noctiflorum L. subsp. defoliatum (Haw.) Klak, indigenous
- Aridaria dejagerae L.Bolus, accepted as Mesembryanthemum noctiflorum L. subsp. stramineum (Haw.) Klak
- Aridaria dinteri L.Bolus, accepted as Mesembryanthemum ligneum (L.Bolus) Klak, indigenous
- Aridaria elongata L.Bolus, accepted as Mesembryanthemum prasinum (L.Bolus) Klak, indigenous
- Aridaria englishiae (L.Bolus) N.E.Br. accepted as Mesembryanthemum englishiae L.Bolus, indigenous
- Aridaria fragilis (N.E.Br.) Friedrich, accepted as Mesembryanthemum oculatum N.E.Br. indigenous
- Aridaria framesii L.Bolus, accepted as Mesembryanthemum spinuliferum Haw. indigenous
- Aridaria geniculiflora (L.) N.E.Br. accepted as Mesembryanthemum geniculiflorum L. indigenous
- Aridaria gibbosa L.Bolus, accepted as Mesembryanthemum spinuliferum Haw. indigenous
- Aridaria glandulifera L.Bolus, accepted as Mesembryanthemum sinuosum L.Bolus, indigenous
- Aridaria godmaniae L.Bolus, accepted as Mesembryanthemum sinuosum L.Bolus, indigenous
- Aridaria gratiae L.Bolus, accepted as Mesembryanthemum grossum Aiton, indigenous
- Aridaria grossa (Aiton) Friedrich, accepted as Mesembryanthemum grossum Aiton, indigenous
- Aridaria herbertii (N.E.Br.) Friedrich, accepted as Mesembryanthemum lilliputanum Klak, indigenous
- Aridaria hesperantha (L.Bolus) N.E.Br. accepted as Mesembryanthemum longistylum DC. indigenous
- Aridaria inaequalis L.Bolus, accepted as Mesembryanthemum nitidum Haw. indigenous
- Aridaria klaverensis L.Bolus, accepted as Mesembryanthemum brevicarpum (L.Bolus) Klak, present
- Aridaria latipetala L.Bolus, accepted as Mesembryanthemum latipetalum (L.Bolus) Klak, indigenous
- Aridaria laxa L.Bolus, accepted as Mesembryanthemum decurvatum (L.Bolus) Klak, indigenous
- Aridaria laxipetala L.Bolus, accepted as Mesembryanthemum grossum Aiton, indigenous
- Aridaria leipoldtii L.Bolus, accepted as Mesembryanthemum noctiflorum L. subsp. noctiflorum, present
- Aridaria lignea L.Bolus, accepted as Mesembryanthemum ligneum (L.Bolus) Klak, indigenous
- Aridaria longispinula (Haw.) L.Bolus, accepted as Mesembryanthemum grossum Aiton, indigenous
- Aridaria longistyla (DC.) Schwantes, accepted as Mesembryanthemum longistylum DC. indigenous
- Aridaria longituba L.Bolus, accepted as Mesembryanthemum tenuiflorum Jacq. indigenous
- Aridaria luteoalba L.Bolus, accepted as Mesembryanthemum tetragonum Thunb. indigenous
- Aridaria macrosiphon L.Bolus, accepted as Mesembryanthemum tenuiflorum Jacq. indigenous
- Aridaria muirii N.E.Br. accepted as Mesembryanthemum noctiflorum L. subsp. defoliatum (Haw.) Klak, present
- Aridaria multiseriata L.Bolus, accepted as Mesembryanthemum prasinum (L.Bolus) Klak, indigenous
- Aridaria mutans L.Bolus, accepted as Mesembryanthemum tetragonum Thunb. present
- Aridaria nevillei L.Bolus, accepted as Mesembryanthemum noctiflorum L. subsp. noctiflorum
- Aridaria nitida (Haw.) N.E.Br. accepted as Mesembryanthemum nitidum Haw. indigenous
- Aridaria noctiflora (L.) Schwantes, accepted as Mesembryanthemum noctiflorum L. subsp. noctiflorum, indigenous
  - Aridaria noctiflora (L.) Schwantes subsp. defoliata (Haw.) Gerbaulet, accepted as Mesembryanthemum noctiflorum L. subsp. defoliatum (Haw.) Klak, endemic
  - Aridaria noctiflora (L.) Schwantes subsp. straminea (Haw.) Gerbaulet, accepted as Mesembryanthemum noctiflorum L. subsp. stramineum (Haw.) Klak, indigenous
  - Aridaria noctiflora (L.) Schwantes var. fulva (Haw.) A.G.J.Herre & Friedrich, accepted as Mesembryanthemum noctiflorum L. subsp. stramineum (Haw.) Klak
- Aridaria obtusa L.Bolus, accepted as Mesembryanthemum decurvatum (L.Bolus) Klak, present
- Aridaria oculata (N.E.Br.) L.Bolus, accepted as Mesembryanthemum oculatum N.E.Br. indigenous
- Aridaria oubergensis L.Bolus, accepted as Mesembryanthemum oubergense (L.Bolus) Klak, indigenous
- Aridaria ovalis L.Bolus, accepted as Mesembryanthemum serotinum (L.Bolus) Klak, present
- Aridaria parvisepala L.Bolus, accepted as Mesembryanthemum spinuliferum Haw. indigenous
- Aridaria pentagona L.Bolus, accepted as Mesembryanthemum splendens L. subsp. pentagonum (L.Bolus) Klak, indigenous
  - Aridaria pentagona L.Bolus var. occidentalis L.Bolus, accepted as Mesembryanthemum splendens L. subsp. pentagonum (L.Bolus) Klak, present
- Aridaria pillansii L.Bolus, accepted as Mesembryanthemum noctiflorum L. subsp. noctiflorum, present
- Aridaria platysepala L.Bolus, accepted as Mesembryanthemum grossum Aiton, indigenous
- Aridaria pomonae L.Bolus, accepted as Mesembryanthemum oculatum N.E.Br. indigenous
- Aridaria prasina L.Bolus, accepted as Mesembryanthemum prasinum (L.Bolus) Klak, indigenous
- Aridaria pumila L.Bolus, accepted as Mesembryanthemum oubergense (L.Bolus) Klak, indigenous
- Aridaria quartzitica L.Bolus, accepted as Mesembryanthemum quartziticola Klak, indigenous
- Aridaria quaterna L.Bolus, accepted as Mesembryanthemum spinuliferum Haw. indigenous
- Aridaria rabiei L.Bolus, accepted as Mesembryanthemum rabiei (L.Bolus) Klak, endemic
- Aridaria radicans L.Bolus, accepted as Mesembryanthemum rhizophorum Klak, indigenous
- Aridaria rangei (N.E.Br.) Friedrich, accepted as Mesembryanthemum oculatum N.E.Br. indigenous
- Aridaria recurva L.Bolus, accepted as Mesembryanthemum sinuosum L.Bolus, indigenous
- Aridaria resurgens (Kensit) L.Bolus, accepted as Mesembryanthemum resurgens Kensit, indigenous
- Aridaria rhodandra L.Bolus, accepted as Mesembryanthemum nitidum Haw. indigenous
- Aridaria saturata L.Bolus, accepted as Mesembryanthemum baylissii (L.Bolus) Klak, present
- Aridaria scintillans (Dinter) Friedrich, accepted as Mesembryanthemum oculatum N.E.Br. indigenous
- Aridaria serotina L.Bolus, accepted as Mesembryanthemum serotinum (L.Bolus) Klak, indigenous
- Aridaria spinulifera (Haw.) N.E.Br. accepted as Mesembryanthemum spinuliferum Haw. indigenous
- Aridaria splendens (L.) Schwantes, accepted as Mesembryanthemum splendens L. subsp. splendens, present
- Aridaria straminea (Haw.) Schwantes, accepted as Mesembryanthemum noctiflorum L. subsp. stramineum (Haw.) Klak, indigenous
- Aridaria straminea L.Bolus, accepted as Mesembryanthemum sinuosum L.Bolus, indigenous
- Aridaria straminicolor L.Bolus, accepted as Mesembryanthemum sinuosum L.Bolus, indigenous
- Aridaria stricta L.Bolus, accepted as Mesembryanthemum spinuliferum Haw. indigenous
- Aridaria subpetiolata L.Bolus, accepted as Mesembryanthemum grossum Aiton, indigenous
- Aridaria suffusa L.Bolus, accepted as Mesembryanthemum tetragonum Thunb. indigenous
- Aridaria tetragona (Thunb.) L.Bolus, accepted as Mesembryanthemum tetragonum Thunb. indigenous
- Aridaria tetramera L.Bolus, accepted as Mesembryanthemum trichotomum Thunb. indigenous
  - Aridaria tetramera L.Bolus var. parviflora L.Bolus, accepted as Mesembryanthemum trichotomum Thunb. indigenous
- Aridaria trichotoma (Thunb.) L.Bolus, accepted as Mesembryanthemum trichotomum Thunb. indigenous
- Aridaria varians L.Bolus, accepted as Mesembryanthemum oculatum N.E.Br. indigenous
- Aridaria vespertina L.Bolus, accepted as Mesembryanthemum occidentale Klak, endemic
- Aridaria viridiflora (Aiton) L.Bolus, accepted as Mesembryanthemum viridiflorum Aiton, indigenous
- Aridaria watermeyeri L.Bolus, accepted as Mesembryanthemum spinuliferum Haw. indigenous
- Aridaria willowmorensis L.Bolus, accepted as Mesembryanthemum grossum Aiton, indigenous

== Aspazoma ==
Genus Aspazoma:

- Aspazoma amplectens (L.Bolus) N.E.Br. accepted as Mesembryanthemum amplectens L.Bolus, endemic

== Astridia ==
Genus Astridia:

- Astridia alba (L.Bolus) L.Bolus, indigenous
- Astridia citrina (L.Bolus) L.Bolus, indigenous
- Astridia dulcis L.Bolus, endemic
- Astridia herrei L.Bolus, endemic
- Astridia hillii L.Bolus, endemic
- Astridia longifolia (L.Bolus) L.Bolus, indigenous
- Astridia lutata (L.Bolus) Friedrich ex H.E.K.Hartmann, indigenous
- Astridia rubra (L.Bolus) L.Bolus, endemic
- Astridia speciosa L.Bolus, indigenous
- Astridia vanheerdei L.Bolus, endemic

== Bergeranthus ==
Genus Bergeranthus:

- Bergeranthus addoensis L.Bolus, endemic
- Bergeranthus albomarginatus A.P.Dold & S.A.Hammer, endemic
- Bergeranthus artus L.Bolus, endemic
- Bergeranthus concavus L.Bolus, endemic
- Bergeranthus firmus L.Bolus, accepted as Bergeranthus multiceps (Salm-Dyck) Schwantes, indigenous
- Bergeranthus glenensis N.E.Br. accepted as Hereroa glenensis (N.E.Br.) L.Bolus, present
- Bergeranthus jamesii L.Bolus, accepted as Bergeranthus vespertinus (A.Berger) Schwantes, indigenous
- Bergeranthus katbergensis L.Bolus, endemic
- Bergeranthus leightoniae L.Bolus, endemic
- Bergeranthus longisepalus L.Bolus, accepted as Bergeranthus vespertinus (A.Berger) Schwantes, indigenous
- Bergeranthus multiceps (Salm-Dyck) Schwantes, endemic
- Bergeranthus nanus A.P.Dold & S.A.Hammer, endemic
- Bergeranthus scapiger (Haw.) Schwantes, endemic
- Bergeranthus stenophyllus (L.Bolus) Schwantes ex Fourc. accepted as Marlothistella stenophylla (L.Bolus) S.A.Hammer, indigenous
- Bergeranthus vespertinus (A.Berger) Schwantes, endemic

== Bijlia ==
Genus Bijlia:

- Bijlia dilatata H.E.K.Hartmann, endemic
- Bijlia tugwelliae (L.Bolus) S.A.Hammer, endemic

== Braunsia ==
Genus Braunsia:

- Braunsia apiculata (Kensit) L.Bolus, endemic
- Braunsia bina (N.E.Br.) Schwantes, endemic
- Braunsia geminata (Haw.) L.Bolus, endemic
- Braunsia maximilianii (Schltr. & A.Berger) Schwantes, endemic
- Braunsia nelii Schwantes, indigenous
- Braunsia stayneri (L.Bolus) L.Bolus, endemic
- Braunsia vanrensburgii (L.Bolus) L.Bolus, endemic

== Brianhuntleya ==
Genus Brianhuntleya:

- Brianhuntleya intrusa (Kensit) Chess. S.A.Hammer & I.Oliv. endemic

== Brownanthus ==
Genus Brownanthus, now a synonym of Mesembryanthemum:

- Brownanthus arenosus (Schinz) Ihlenf. & Bittrich, accepted as Mesembryanthemum arenosum Schinz, indigenous
- Brownanthus ciliatus (Aiton) Schwantes, accepted as Mesembryanthemum vaginatum Lam. indigenous
  - Brownanthus ciliatus (Aiton) Schwantes subsp. schenkii (Schinz) Ihlenf. & Bittrich, accepted as Mesembryanthemum schenkii Schinz, indigenous
- Brownanthus corallinus (Thunb.) Ihlenf. & Bittrich, accepted as Mesembryanthemum corallinum Thunb. indigenous
- Brownanthus fraternus Klak, accepted as Mesembryanthemum napierense Klak, endemic
- Brownanthus glareicola Klak, accepted as Mesembryanthemum glareicola (Klak) Klak, endemic
- Brownanthus lignescens Klak, accepted as Mesembryanthemum springbokense Klak, endemic
- Brownanthus marlothii (Pax) Schwantes, accepted as Mesembryanthemum marlothii Pax, indigenous
- Brownanthus neglectus S.M.Pierce & Gerbaulet, accepted as Mesembryanthemum neglectum (S.M.Pierce & Gerbaulet) Klak, indigenous
- Brownanthus nucifer (Ihlenf. & Bittrich) S.M.Pierce & Gerbaulet, accepted as Mesembryanthemum nucifer (Ihlenf. & Bittrich) Klak, indigenous
- Brownanthus pseudoschlichtianus S.M.Pierce & Gerbaulet, accepted as Mesembryanthemum pseudoschlichtianum (S.M.Pierce & Gerbaulet) Klak, indigenous
- Brownanthus pubescens (N.E.Br. ex C.A.Maass) Bullock, accepted as Mesembryanthemum tomentosum Klak, indigenous
- Brownanthus schenckii (Schinz) Schwantes, accepted as Mesembryanthemum schenkii Schinz, indigenous
- Brownanthus schlichtianus (Sond.) Ihlenf. & Bittrich, accepted as Mesembryanthemum arenosum Schinz, present
- Brownanthus vaginatus (Lam.) Chess. & M.Pignal, accepted as Mesembryanthemum vaginatum Lam. endemic

== Calamophyllum ==
Genus Calamophyllum:

- Calamophyllum cylindricum (Haw.) Schwantes, endemic
- Calamophyllum teretifolium (Haw.) Schwantes, endemic
- Calamophyllum teretiusculum (Haw.) Schwantes, endemic

== Callistigma ==
Genus Callistigma:

- Callistigma inachabense (Engl.) Dinter & Schwantes, accepted as Mesembryanthemum inachabense Engl. indigenous

== Carpanthea ==
Genus Carpanthea:

- Carpanthea pomeridiana (L.) N.E.Br. endemic

== Carpobrotus ==
Genus Carpobrotus:

- Carpobrotus acinaciformis (L.) L.Bolus, endemic
- Carpobrotus concavus L.Bolus, accepted as Carpobrotus acinaciformis (L.) L.Bolus, present
- Carpobrotus deliciosus (L.Bolus) L.Bolus, endemic
- Carpobrotus dimidiatus (Haw.) L.Bolus, indigenous
- Carpobrotus dulcis L.Bolus, accepted as Carpobrotus deliciosus (L.Bolus) L.Bolus, present
- Carpobrotus edulis (L.) L.Bolus, indigenous
  - Carpobrotus edulis (L.) L.Bolus subsp. edulis, endemic
  - Carpobrotus edulis (L.) L.Bolus subsp. parviflorus Wisura & Glen, endemic
- Carpobrotus fourcadei L.Bolus var. alba L.Bolus, accepted as Carpobrotus deliciosus (L.Bolus) L.Bolus, present
- Carpobrotus fourcadei L.Bolus var. fourcadei, accepted as Carpobrotus deliciosus (L.Bolus) L.Bolus, present
- Carpobrotus juritzii (L.Bolus) L.Bolus, accepted as Carpobrotus dimidiatus (Haw.) L.Bolus, present
- Carpobrotus laevigatus (Haw.) N.E.Br. accepted as Carpobrotus acinaciformis (L.) L.Bolus, present
- Carpobrotus laevigatus (Haw.) Schwantes, accepted as Carpobrotus acinaciformis (L.) L.Bolus, present
- Carpobrotus mellei (L.Bolus) L.Bolus, endemic
- Carpobrotus muirii (L.Bolus) L.Bolus, endemic
- Carpobrotus pageae L.Bolus, accepted as Carpobrotus mellei (L.Bolus) L.Bolus, present
- Carpobrotus pillansii L.Bolus, accepted as Carpobrotus mellei (L.Bolus) L.Bolus, present
- Carpobrotus quadrifidus L.Bolus, endemic
  - Carpobrotus quadrifidus L.Bolus forma rosea (L.Bolus) G.D.Rowley, accepted as Carpobrotus quadrifidus L.Bolus, present
- Carpobrotus quadrifidus L.Bolus var. rosea L.Bolus, accepted as Carpobrotus quadrifidus L.Bolus, present
- Carpobrotus rubrocinctus (Haw.) N.E.Br. accepted as Carpobrotus acinaciformis (L.) L.Bolus, present
- Carpobrotus sauerae Schwantes, accepted as Carpobrotus quadrifidus L.Bolus, present
- Carpobrotus subulatus (Haw.) N.E.Br. accepted as Carpobrotus acinaciformis (L.) L.Bolus, present
- Carpobrotus vanzijliae L.Bolus, accepted as Carpobrotus acinaciformis (L.) L.Bolus, present

== Carruanthus ==
Genus Carruanthus:

- Carruanthus peersii L.Bolus, endemic
- Carruanthus ringens (L.) Boom, endemic

== Caryotophora ==
Genus Caryotophora:

- Caryotophora skiatophytoides Leistner, endemic

== Caulipsolon ==
Genus Caulipsolon:

- Caulipsolon rapaceum (Jacq.) Klak, accepted as Mesembryanthemum rapaceum Jacq. endemic

== Cephalophyllum ==
Genus Cephalophyllum:

- Cephalophyllum alstonii Marloth ex L.Bolus, endemic
- Cephalophyllum apiculatum L.Bolus, accepted as Cephalophyllum loreum (L.) Schwantes, present
- Cephalophyllum aurantiacum L.Bolus, accepted as Cephalophyllum purpureo-album (Haw.) Schwantes, present
- Cephalophyllum aureorubrum L.Bolus, accepted as Cephalophyllum rigidum L.Bolus, present
- Cephalophyllum ausense L.Bolus, accepted as Cephalophyllum ebracteatum (Pax ex Schltr. & Diels) Dinter & Schwantes
- Cephalophyllum baylissii L.Bolus, accepted as Cephalophyllum diversiphyllum (Haw.) H.E.K.Hartmann, present
- Cephalophyllum bredasdorpense L.Bolus, accepted as Cephalophyllum diversiphyllum (Haw.) H.E.K.Hartmann, present
- Cephalophyllum brevifolium L.Bolus, accepted as Cephalophyllum pulchellum L.Bolus, present
- Cephalophyllum caespitosum H.E.K.Hartmann, endemic
- Cephalophyllum caledonicum L.Bolus, accepted as Cephalophyllum diversiphyllum (Haw.) H.E.K.Hartmann, present
- Cephalophyllum cauliculatum (Haw.) N.E.Br. accepted as Cephalophyllum diversiphyllum (Haw.) H.E.K.Hartmann, present
- Cephalophyllum cedrimontanum L.Bolus, accepted as Cephalophyllum loreum (L.) Schwantes, present
- Cephalophyllum ceresianum L.Bolus, accepted as Cephalophyllum corniculatum (L.) Schwantes, present
- Cephalophyllum compactum L.Bolus, accepted as Cephalophyllum loreum (L.) Schwantes, present
- Cephalophyllum conicum L.Bolus ex H.Jacobsen, accepted as Cephalophyllum curtophyllum (L.Bolus) Schwantes, present
- Cephalophyllum corniculatum (L.) Schwantes, endemic
- Cephalophyllum crassum L.Bolus, accepted as Cephalophyllum tricolorum (Haw.) Schwantes, present
- Cephalophyllum curtophyllum (L.Bolus) Schwantes, endemic
- Cephalophyllum decipiens (Haw.) L.Bolus, accepted as Cephalophyllum loreum (L.) Schwantes, present
- Cephalophyllum diminutum (Haw.) L.Bolus, accepted as Cephalophyllum subulatoides (Haw.) N.E.Br. present
- Cephalophyllum diversiphyllum (Haw.) H.E.K.Hartmann, endemic
- Cephalophyllum ebracteatum (Pax ex Schltr. & Diels) Dinter & Schwantes, indigenous
- Cephalophyllum ernii L.Bolus, accepted as Cephalophyllum ebracteatum (Pax ex Schltr. & Diels) Dinter & Schwantes
- Cephalophyllum framesii L.Bolus, endemic
- Cephalophyllum franciscii L.Bolus, accepted as Cephalophyllum alstonii Marloth ex L.Bolus, present
- Cephalophyllum fulleri L.Bolus, endemic
- Cephalophyllum goodii L.Bolus, endemic
- Cephalophyllum gracile L.Bolus, accepted as Cephalophyllum purpureo-album (Haw.) Schwantes, present
  - Cephalophyllum gracile L.Bolus var. longisepalum L.Bolus, accepted as Cephalophyllum purpureo-album (Haw.) Schwantes, present
- Cephalophyllum griseum (S.A.Hammer & U.Schmiedel) H.E.K.Hartmann, endemic
- Cephalophyllum hallii L.Bolus, endemic
- Cephalophyllum herrei L.Bolus, indigenous
  - Cephalophyllum herrei L.Bolus var. decumbens L.Bolus, accepted as Cephalophyllum numeesense H.E.K.Hartmann, present
- Cephalophyllum inaequale L.Bolus, endemic
- Cephalophyllum insigne L.Bolus, accepted as Cephalophyllum rigidum L.Bolus, present
- Cephalophyllum kliprandense L.Bolus, accepted as Cephalophyllum parvibracteatum (L.Bolus) H.E.K.Hartmann, present
- Cephalophyllum laetulum L.Bolus, accepted as Cephalophyllum ebracteatum (Pax ex Schltr. & Diels) Dinter & Schwantes, present
- Cephalophyllum littlewoodii L.Bolus, accepted as Cephalophyllum purpureo-album (Haw.) Schwantes, present
- Cephalophyllum loreum (L.) Schwantes, endemic
- Cephalophyllum maritimum (L.Bolus) Schwantes, accepted as Jordaaniella maritima (L.Bolus) Van Jaarsv. indigenous
- Cephalophyllum middlemostii L.Bolus, accepted as Cephalophyllum purpureo-album (Haw.) Schwantes, present
- Cephalophyllum namaquanum L.Bolus, accepted as Cephalophyllum ebracteatum (Pax ex Schltr. & Diels) Dinter & Schwantes, present
- Cephalophyllum niveum L.Bolus, endemic
- Cephalophyllum numeesense H.E.K.Hartmann, endemic
- Cephalophyllum pallens L.Bolus, accepted as Cephalophyllum herrei L.Bolus
- Cephalophyllum parvibracteatum (L.Bolus) H.E.K.Hartmann, endemic
- Cephalophyllum parviflorum L.Bolus, endemic
- Cephalophyllum parviflorum L.Bolus var. proliferum L.Bolus, accepted as Cephalophyllum parviflorum L.Bolus, present
- Cephalophyllum parvulum (Schltr.) H.E.K.Hartmann, endemic
- Cephalophyllum paucifolium L.Bolus, accepted as Cephalophyllum purpureo-album (Haw.) Schwantes, present
- Cephalophyllum pillansii L.Bolus, endemic
  - Cephalophyllum pillansii L.Bolus var. grandiflorum L.Bolus, accepted as Cephalophyllum pillansii L.Bolus, present
- Cephalophyllum primulinum (L.Bolus) Schwantes, accepted as Cephalophyllum loreum (L.) Schwantes, present
- Cephalophyllum pulchellum L.Bolus, endemic
- Cephalophyllum pulchrum L.Bolus, endemic
- Cephalophyllum purpureo-album (Haw.) Schwantes, endemic
- Cephalophyllum rangei (Engl.) L.Bolus ex H.Jacobsen, accepted as Cephalophyllum ebracteatum (Pax ex Schltr. & Diels) Dinter & Schwantes, present
- Cephalophyllum regale L.Bolus, endemic
- Cephalophyllum rigidum L.Bolus, endemic
- Cephalophyllum roseum (L.Bolus) L.Bolus, accepted as Leipoldtia rosea L.Bolus, present
- Cephalophyllum rostellum (L.Bolus) H.E.K.Hartmann, endemic
- Cephalophyllum serrulatum L.Bolus, accepted as Cephalophyllum purpureo-album (Haw.) Schwantes, present
- Cephalophyllum spissum H.E.K.Hartmann, endemic
- Cephalophyllum spongiosum (L.Bolus) L.Bolus, accepted as Jordaaniella spongiosa (L.Bolus) H.E.K.Hartmann, present
- Cephalophyllum staminodiosum L.Bolus, endemic
- Cephalophyllum stayneri L.Bolus, accepted as Cephalophyllum framesii L.Bolus, present
- Cephalophyllum subulatoides (Haw.) N.E.Br. endemic
- Cephalophyllum tenuifolium L.Bolus, accepted as Cephalophyllum tricolorum (Haw.) Schwantes, present
- Cephalophyllum tetrastichum H.E.K.Hartmann, endemic
- Cephalophyllum tricolorum (Haw.) Schwantes, endemic
- Cephalophyllum truncatum L.Bolus, accepted as Cephalophyllum niveum L.Bolus, present
- Cephalophyllum validum (Haw.) Schwantes, accepted as Ruschia vetovalida H.E.K.Hartmann, present
- Cephalophyllum vandermerwei L.Bolus, accepted as Cephalophyllum diversiphyllum (Haw.) H.E.K.Hartmann, present
- Cephalophyllum vanheerdei L.Bolus, accepted as Cephalophyllum regale L.Bolus, present
- Cephalophyllum worcesterense L.Bolus, accepted as Cephalophyllum purpureo-album (Haw.) Schwantes, present

== Cerochlamys ==
Genus Cerochlamys:

- Cerochlamys gemina (L.Bolus) H.E.K.Hartmann, endemic
- Cerochlamys pachyphylla (L.Bolus) L.Bolus, endemic
- Cerochlamys purpureostyla (L.Bolus) H.E.K.Hartmann, accepted as Acrodon purpureostylus (L.Bolus) Burgoyne, indigenous
- Cerochlamys trigona N.E.Br. endemic

== Chasmatophyllum ==
Genus Chasmatophyllum:

- Chasmatophyllum braunsii Schwantes, endemic
- Chasmatophyllum braunsii Schwantes var. majus L.Bolus, accepted as Chasmatophyllum braunsii Schwantes, present
- Chasmatophyllum maninum L.Bolus, endemic
- Chasmatophyllum musculinum (Haw.) Dinter & Schwantes, indigenous
- Chasmatophyllum nelii Schwantes, endemic
- Chasmatophyllum rouxii L.Bolus, endemic
- Chasmatophyllum stanleyi (L.Bolus) H.E.K.Hartmann, endemic
- Chasmatophyllum verdoorniae (N.E.Br.) L.Bolus, endemic
- Chasmatophyllum willowmorense (L.Bolus) L.Bolus, endemic

== Cheiridopsis ==
Genus Cheiridopsis:

- Cheiridopsis acuminata L.Bolus, endemic
- Cheiridopsis alba-oculata Klak & Helme, endemic
- Cheiridopsis amabilis S.A.Hammer, endemic
- Cheiridopsis aspera L.Bolus, endemic
- Cheiridopsis brownii Schick & Tischer, indigenous
- Cheiridopsis campanulata G.Will. endemic
- Cheiridopsis cigarettifera (A.Berger) N.E.Br. accepted as Cheiridopsis namaquensis (Sond.) H.E.K.Hartmann [1], present
- Cheiridopsis delphinoides S.A.Hammer, endemic
- Cheiridopsis denticulata (Haw.) N.E.Br. endemic
- Cheiridopsis derenbergiana Schwantes, endemic
- Cheiridopsis gamoepensis S.A.Hammer, endemic
- Cheiridopsis glomerata S.A.Hammer, endemic
- Cheiridopsis herrei L.Bolus, endemic
- Cheiridopsis imitans L.Bolus, endemic
- Cheiridopsis meyeri N.E.Br. endemic
- Cheiridopsis minima Tischer, accepted as Antimima minima (Tischer) H.E.K.Hartmann, present
- Cheiridopsis minor (L.Bolus) H.E.K.Hartmann, endemic
- Cheiridopsis namaquensis (Sond.) H.E.K.Hartmann, endemic
- Cheiridopsis nelii Schwantes, endemic
- Cheiridopsis parvibracteata L.Bolus, accepted as Cephalophyllum parvibracteatum (L.Bolus) H.E.K.Hartmann, present
- Cheiridopsis pearsonii N.E.Br. endemic
- Cheiridopsis peculiaris N.E.Br. endemic
- Cheiridopsis pillansii L.Bolus, endemic
- Cheiridopsis pilosula L.Bolus, endemic
- Cheiridopsis ponderosa S.A.Hammer, endemic
- Cheiridopsis purpurata L.Bolus, accepted as Cheiridopsis purpurea L.Bolus, present
- Cheiridopsis purpurea L.Bolus, endemic
- Cheiridopsis robusta (Haw.) N.E.Br. indigenous
- Cheiridopsis rostrata (L.) N.E.Br. indigenous
- Cheiridopsis rudis L.Bolus, endemic
- Cheiridopsis schlechteri Tischer, endemic
- Cheiridopsis speciosa L.Bolus, endemic
- Cheiridopsis turbinata L.Bolus, endemic
- Cheiridopsis umbrosa S.A.Hammer & Desmet, endemic
- Cheiridopsis umdausensis L.Bolus, endemic
- Cheiridopsis velox S.A.Hammer, endemic
- Cheiridopsis verrucosa L.Bolus, endemic
- Cheiridopsis verrucosa L.Bolus var. minor L.Bolus, accepted as Cheiridopsis verrucosa L.Bolus, present

== Circandra ==
Genus Circandra:

- Circandra serrata (L.) N.E.Br. endemic

== Cleretum ==
Genus Cleretum:

- Cleretum apetalum (L.f.) N.E.Br. endemic
- Cleretum bellidiforme (Burm.f.) G.D.Rowley, endemic
- Cleretum booysenii (L.Bolus) Klak, endemic
- Cleretum bruynsii Klak, indigenous
- Cleretum clavatum (Haw.) Klak, endemic
- Cleretum herrei (Schwantes) Ihlenf. & Struck, endemic
- Cleretum lyratifolium Ihlenf. & Struck, endemic
- Cleretum maughanii (N.E.Br.) Klak, endemic
- Cleretum papulosum (L.f.) L.Bolus [2], indigenous
  - Cleretum papulosum (L.f.) L.Bolus subsp. papulosum, endemic
  - Cleretum papulosum (L.f.) L.Bolus subsp. schlechteri (Schwantes) Ihlenf. & Struck, endemic
- Cleretum patersonjonesii Klak, indigenous
- Cleretum puberulum (Haw.) N.E.Br. accepted as Mesembryanthemum aitonis Jacq. indigenous
- Cleretum rourkei (L.Bolus) Klak, endemic

== Conicosia ==
Genus Conicosia:

- Conicosia coruscans (Haw.) Schwantes, accepted as Conicosia elongata (Haw.) N.E.Br. present
- Conicosia elongata (Haw.) N.E.Br. endemic
- Conicosia pugioniformis (L.) N.E.Br. indigenous
  - Conicosia pugioniformis (L.) N.E.Br. subsp. alborosea (L.Bolus) Ihlenf. & Gerbaulet, endemic
  - Conicosia pugioniformis (L.) N.E.Br. subsp. muiri (N.E.Br.) Ihlenf. & Gerbaulet, endemic
  - Conicosia pugioniformis (L.) N.E.Br. subsp. pugioniformis, endemic

== Conophyllum ==
Genus Conophyllum:

- Conophyllum globosum L.Bolus, accepted as Meyerophytum globosum (L.Bolus) Ihlenf. present

== Conophytum ==
Genus Conophytum:

- Conophytum absimile L.Bolus, accepted as Conophytum bilobum (Marloth) N.E.Br. subsp. bilobum var. bilobum, present
  - Conophytum absimile L.Bolus forma umbrosum L.Bolus, accepted as Conophytum bilobum (Marloth) N.E.Br. subsp. bilobum var. bilobum, present
  - Conophytum absimile L.Bolus var. major L.Bolus, accepted as Conophytum bilobum (Marloth) N.E.Br. subsp. bilobum var. bilobum, present
- Conophytum achabense S.A.Hammer, endemic
- Conophytum acutum L.Bolus, endemic
- Conophytum admiraalii L.Bolus, accepted as Conophytum jucundum (N.E.Br.) N.E.Br. subsp. jucundum, present
- Conophytum advenum N.E.Br. accepted as Conophytum piluliforme (N.E.Br.) N.E.Br. subsp. piluliforme, present
- Conophytum aequale L.Bolus, accepted as Conophytum bilobum (Marloth) N.E.Br. subsp. bilobum var. bilobum, present
- Conophytum aequatum L.Bolus, accepted as Conophytum pageae (N.E.Br.) N.E.Br. present
- Conophytum aggregatum (Haw. ex N.E.Br.) N.E.Br. accepted as Conophytum piluliforme (N.E.Br.) N.E.Br. subsp. piluliforme, present
- Conophytum albertense (N.E.Br.) N.E.Br. accepted as Conophytum truncatum (Thunb.) N.E.Br. subsp. truncatum var. truncatum, present
- Conophytum albescens N.E.Br. accepted as Conophytum bilobum (Marloth) N.E.Br. subsp. bilobum var. bilobum, present
- Conophytum albifissum Tischer, accepted as Conophytum minimum (Haw.) N.E.Br. present
- Conophytum albiflorum (Rawe) S.A.Hammer, endemic
- Conophytum altile (N.E.Br.) N.E.Br. accepted as Conophytum ficiforme (Haw.) N.E.Br. present
- Conophytum altum L.Bolus, accepted as Conophytum bilobum (Marloth) N.E.Br. subsp. altum (L.Bolus) S.A.Hammer, present
- Conophytum altum L.Bolus var. plenum L.Bolus, accepted as Conophytum bilobum (Marloth) N.E.Br. subsp. altum (L.Bolus) S.A.Hammer, present
- Conophytum ampliatum L.Bolus, accepted as Conophytum bilobum (Marloth) N.E.Br. subsp. bilobum var. bilobum, present
- Conophytum amplum L.Bolus, accepted as Conophytum bilobum (Marloth) N.E.Br. subsp. bilobum var. bilobum, present
- Conophytum andausanum N.E.Br. accepted as Conophytum bilobum (Marloth) N.E.Br. subsp. bilobum var. bilobum, present
- Conophytum andausanum N.E.Br. var. immaculatum L.Bolus, accepted as Conophytum bilobum (Marloth) N.E.Br. subsp. bilobum var. bilobum, present
  - Conophytum angelicae (Dinter & Schwantes) N.E.Br. indigenous
  - Conophytum angelicae (Dinter & Schwantes) N.E.Br. subsp. angelicae, indigenous
  - Conophytum angelicae (Dinter & Schwantes) N.E.Br. subsp. tetragonum Rawe & S.A.Hammer, endemic
- Conophytum angustum L.Bolus, accepted as Conophytum bilobum (Marloth) N.E.Br. subsp. bilobum var. bilobum, present
- Conophytum angustum N.E.Br. accepted as Conophytum bilobum (Marloth) N.E.Br. subsp. bilobum var. bilobum, present
- Conophytum anjametae de Boer, accepted as Conophytum violaciflorum Schick & Tischer, present
- Conophytum antonii S.A.Hammer, indigenous
- Conophytum apiatum (N.E.Br.) N.E.Br. accepted as Conophytum bilobum (Marloth) N.E.Br. subsp. bilobum var. bilobum, present
- Conophytum apiculatum N.E.Br. accepted as Conophytum bilobum (Marloth) N.E.Br. subsp. bilobum var. bilobum, present
- Conophytum approximatum Lavis, accepted as Conophytum bilobum (Marloth) N.E.Br. subsp. bilobum var. bilobum
- Conophytum archeri Lavis, accepted as Conophytum piluliforme (N.E.Br.) N.E.Br. subsp. piluliforme, present
- Conophytum archeri Lavis var. stayneri L.Bolus, accepted as Conophytum truncatum (Thunb.) N.E.Br. subsp. viridicatum (N.E.Br.) S.A.Hammer, present
- Conophytum areolatum Littlew. accepted as Conophytum pellucidum Schwantes subsp. pellucidum var. pellucidum, present
- Conophytum armianum S.A.Hammer, endemic
- Conophytum arthurolfago S.A.Hammer, endemic
- Conophytum asperulum L.Bolus, accepted as Conophytum bilobum (Marloth) N.E.Br. subsp. bilobum var. bilobum, present
- Conophytum asperulum L.Bolus var. brevistylum L.Bolus, accepted as Conophytum bilobum (Marloth) N.E.Br. subsp. bilobum var. bilobum, present
- Conophytum assimile (N.E.Br.) N.E.Br. accepted as Conophytum ficiforme (Haw.) N.E.Br. present
- Conophytum astylum L.Bolus, accepted as Conophytum pellucidum Schwantes subsp. cupreatum (Tischer) S.A.Hammer var. cupreatum, present
- Conophytum auctum N.E.Br. accepted as Conophytum bilobum (Marloth) N.E.Br. subsp. bilobum var. bilobum, present
- Conophytum auctum N.E.Br. forma approximatum (Lavis) Rawe, accepted as Conophytum bilobum (Marloth) N.E.Br. subsp. bilobum var. bilobum, present
- Conophytum auriflorum Tischer, indigenous
  - Conophytum auriflorum Tischer subsp. auriflorum, endemic
  - Conophytum auriflorum Tischer subsp. turbiniforme (Rawe) S.A.Hammer, endemic
- Conophytum avenantii L.Bolus, accepted as Conophytum jucundum (N.E.Br.) N.E.Br. subsp. fragile (Tischer) S.A.Hammer, present
- Conophytum bachelorum S.A.Hammer, endemic
  - Conophytum bachelorum S.A.Hammer subsp. sponsaliorum S.A.Hammer, accepted as Conophytum obscurum N.E.Br. subsp. sponsaliorum (S.A.Hammer) S.A.Hammer, present
- Conophytum barbatum L.Bolus, accepted as Conophytum obscurum N.E.Br. subsp. barbatum (L.Bolus) S.A.Hammer, present
- Conophytum batesii N.E.Br. accepted as Conophytum minimum (Haw.) N.E.Br. present
- Conophytum bicarinatum L.Bolus, endemic
- Conophytum bilobum (Marloth) N.E.Br. indigenous
  - Conophytum bilobum (Marloth) N.E.Br. subsp. altum (L.Bolus) S.A.Hammer, endemic
  - Conophytum bilobum (Marloth) N.E.Br. subsp. bilobum var. bilobum, indigenous
  - Conophytum bilobum (Marloth) N.E.Br. subsp. bilobum var. elishae, endemic
  - Conophytum bilobum (Marloth) N.E.Br. subsp. bilobum var. linearilucidum, endemic
  - Conophytum bilobum (Marloth) N.E.Br. subsp. bilobum var. muscosipapillatum, endemic
  - Conophytum bilobum (Marloth) N.E.Br. subsp. claviferens S.A.Hammer, endemic
  - Conophytum bilobum (Marloth) N.E.Br. subsp. gracilistylum (L.Bolus) S.A.Hammer, endemic
- Conophytum blandum L.Bolus, endemic
- Conophytum bolusiae Schwantes, indigenous
  - Conophytum bolusiae Schwantes subsp. bolusiae, endemic
  - Conophytum bolusiae Schwantes subsp. primavernum S.A.Hammer, endemic
- Conophytum boreale L.Bolus, accepted as Conophytum lithopsoides L.Bolus subsp. boreale (L.Bolus) S.A.Hammer, present
- Conophytum braunsii Tischer, accepted as Conophytum minutum (Haw.) N.E.Br. var. pearsonii (N.E.Br.) Boom, present
- Conophytum breve N.E.Br. endemic
  - Conophytum breve N.E.Br. var. minor L.Bolus, accepted as Conophytum breve N.E.Br. present
  - Conophytum breve N.E.Br. var. minutiflorum (Schwantes) Rawe, accepted as Conophytum pageae (N.E.Br.) N.E.Br. present
  - Conophytum breve N.E.Br. var. vanzylii (Lavis) Rawe, accepted as Conophytum calculus (A.Berger) N.E.Br. subsp. vanzylii (Lavis) S.A.Hammer, present
- Conophytum brevilineatum Tischer, accepted as Conophytum minimum (Haw.) N.E.Br. present
- Conophytum brevipes L.Bolus, accepted as Conophytum wettsteinii (A.Berger) N.E.Br. present
- Conophytum brevipetalum Lavis, accepted as Conophytum piluliforme (N.E.Br.) N.E.Br. subsp. piluliforme, present
- Conophytum brevisectum L.Bolus, accepted as Conophytum bilobum (Marloth) N.E.Br. subsp. bilobum var. bilobum, present
- Conophytum brunneum S.A.Hammer, endemic
- Conophytum bruynsii S.A.Hammer, endemic
- Conophytum burgeri L.Bolus, endemic
- Conophytum buysianum A.R.Mitch. & S.A.Hammer, accepted as Conophytum reconditum A.R.Mitch. subsp. buysianum (A.R.Mitch. & S.A.Hammer) S.A.Hammer, present
- Conophytum calculus (A.Berger) N.E.Br. indigenous
  - Conophytum calculus (A.Berger) N.E.Br. subsp. calculus, endemic
  - Conophytum calculus (A.Berger) N.E.Br. subsp. vanzylii (Lavis) S.A.Hammer, endemic
  - Conophytum calculus (A.Berger) N.E.Br. var. komkansicum (L.Bolus) Rawe, accepted as Conophytum calculus (A.Berger) N.E.Br. subsp. calculus, present
  - Conophytum calculus (A.Berger) N.E.Br. var. protusum L.Bolus, accepted as Conophytum pageae (N.E.Br.) N.E.Br. present
- Conophytum calitzdorpense L.Bolus, accepted as Conophytum truncatum (Thunb.) N.E.Br. subsp. truncatum var. wiggettiae, present
- Conophytum calitzdorpense Tischer, accepted as Conophytum truncatum (Thunb.) N.E.Br. subsp. truncatum var. wiggettiae, present
- Conophytum caroli Lavis, endemic
- Conophytum carpianum L.Bolus, endemic
- Conophytum catervum (N.E.Br.) N.E.Br. accepted as Conophytum truncatum (Thunb.) N.E.Br. subsp. viridicatum (N.E.Br.) S.A.Hammer, present
- Conophytum cauliferum N.E.Br. accepted as Conophytum bilobum (Marloth) N.E.Br. subsp. bilobum var. bilobum, present
  - Conophytum cauliferum N.E.Br. var. lekkersingense L.Bolus, accepted as Conophytum bilobum (Marloth) N.E.Br. subsp. bilobum var. bilobum, present
- Conophytum ceresianum L.Bolus, accepted as Conophytum obcordellum (Haw.) N.E.Br. subsp. obcordellum var. ceresianum, present
- Conophytum chauviniae (Schwantes) S.A.Hammer, endemic
- Conophytum chloratum Tischer, accepted as Conophytum ectypum N.E.Br. subsp. ectypum, present
- Conophytum chrisocruxum S.A.Hammer, endemic
- Conophytum chrisolum S.A.Hammer, endemic
- Conophytum christiansenianum L.Bolus, accepted as Conophytum bilobum (Marloth) N.E.Br. subsp. bilobum var. bilobum, present
- Conophytum cibdelum N.E.Br. accepted as Conophytum truncatum (Thunb.) N.E.Br. subsp. truncatum var. truncatum, present
- Conophytum circumpunctatum Schick & Tischer, accepted as Conophytum wettsteinii (A.Berger) N.E.Br. present
- Conophytum citrinum L.Bolus, accepted as Conophytum bilobum (Marloth) N.E.Br. subsp. bilobum var. bilobum, present
- Conophytum compressum N.E.Br. accepted as Conophytum bilobum (Marloth) N.E.Br. subsp. bilobum var. bilobum, present
- Conophytum comptonii N.E.Br. endemic
- Conophytum concavum L.Bolus, endemic
- Conophytum concinnum Schwantes, accepted as Conophytum flavum N.E.Br. subsp. flavum, present
- Conophytum concordans G.D.Rowley, endemic
- Conophytum confusum A.J.Young, Rogerson, S.A.Hammer & Opel, endemic
- Conophytum connatum L.Bolus, accepted as Conophytum bilobum (Marloth) N.E.Br. subsp. altum (L.Bolus) S.A.Hammer, present
- Conophytum conradii L.Bolus, accepted as Conophytum bilobum (Marloth) N.E.Br. subsp. bilobum var. bilobum, present
- Conophytum convexum L.Bolus, accepted as Conophytum bilobum (Marloth) N.E.Br. subsp. bilobum var. bilobum, present
- Conophytum corculum Schwantes, accepted as Conophytum meyeri N.E.Br. present
- Conophytum cordatum Schick & Tischer, accepted as Conophytum bilobum (Marloth) N.E.Br. subsp. bilobum var. bilobum, present
  - Conophytum cordatum Schick & Tischer var. macrostigma L.Bolus, accepted as Conophytum bilobum (Marloth) N.E.Br. subsp. bilobum var. bilobum, present
- Conophytum coriaceum L.Bolus, accepted as Conophytum bilobum (Marloth) N.E.Br. subsp. bilobum var. bilobum, present
- Conophytum corniferum Schick & Tischer, accepted as Conophytum bilobum (Marloth) N.E.Br. subsp. altum (L.Bolus) S.A.Hammer, present
- Conophytum crassum L.Bolus, accepted as Conophytum bilobum (Marloth) N.E.Br. subsp. bilobum var. bilobum, present
- Conophytum crateriforme A.J.Young, Rogerson, Harrower & S.A.Hammer, endemic
- Conophytum cubicum Pavelka, endemic
- Conophytum cupreatum Tischer, accepted as Conophytum pellucidum Schwantes subsp. cupreatum (Tischer) S.A.Hammer var. cupreatum, present
- Conophytum cupreiflorum Tischer, endemic
- Conophytum curtum L.Bolus, accepted as Conophytum bilobum (Marloth) N.E.Br. subsp. bilobum var. bilobum, present
- Conophytum cylindratum Schwantes, accepted as Conophytum roodiae N.E.Br. subsp. cylindratum (Schwantes) Smale, present
  - Conophytum cylindratum Schwantes var. primosii (Lavis) Rawe, accepted as Conophytum roodiae N.E.Br. subsp. cylindratum (Schwantes) Smale, present
- Conophytum declinatum L.Bolus, accepted as Conophytum obcordellum (Haw.) N.E.Br. subsp. obcordellum var. obcordellum, present
- Conophytum decoratum N.E.Br. accepted as Conophytum uviforme (Haw.) N.E.Br. subsp. decoratum (N.E.Br.) S.A.Hammer, present
- Conophytum dennisii N.E.Br. accepted as Conophytum bilobum (Marloth) N.E.Br. subsp. bilobum var. bilobum, present
- Conophytum densipunctum L.Bolus, accepted as Conophytum quaesitum (N.E.Br.) N.E.Br. subsp. densipunctum (L.Bolus) S.A.Hammer, present
- Conophytum depressum Lavis, indigenous
  - Conophytum depressum Lavis subsp. depressum, endemic
  - Conophytum depressum Lavis subsp. perdurans S.A.Hammer, endemic
- Conophytum devium G.D.Rowley, indigenous
  - Conophytum devium G.D.Rowley subsp. devium, endemic
  - Conophytum devium G.D.Rowley subsp. stiriferum S.A.Hammer & Barnhill, endemic
- Conophytum difforme L.Bolus, accepted as Conophytum bilobum (Marloth) N.E.Br. subsp. bilobum var. bilobum, present
- Conophytum dilatatum Tischer, accepted as Conophytum bilobum (Marloth) N.E.Br. subsp. bilobum var. bilobum, present
- Conophytum discrepans G.D.Rowley, accepted as Conophytum maughanii N.E.Br. subsp. latum (Tischer) S.A.Hammer, present
  - Conophytum discrepans G.D.Rowley forma rubrum (Tischer) G.D.Rowley, accepted as Conophytum maughanii N.E.Br. subsp. latum (Tischer) S.A.Hammer, present
- Conophytum dispar N.E.Br. accepted as Conophytum truncatum (Thunb.) N.E.Br. subsp. viridicatum (N.E.Br.) S.A.Hammer, present
- Conophytum dissimile L.Bolus, accepted as Conophytum bilobum (Marloth) N.E.Br. subsp. bilobum var. bilobum, present
- Conophytum distans L.Bolus, accepted as Conophytum bilobum (Marloth) N.E.Br. subsp. bilobum var. bilobum, present
- Conophytum divaricatum N.E.Br. accepted as Conophytum bilobum (Marloth) N.E.Br. subsp. bilobum var. bilobum, present
- Conophytum diversum N.E.Br. accepted as Conophytum bilobum (Marloth) N.E.Br. subsp. bilobum var. bilobum, present
- Conophytum dolomiticum Tischer, accepted as Conophytum bilobum (Marloth) N.E.Br. subsp. bilobum var. bilobum, present
- Conophytum doornense N.E.Br. accepted as Conophytum breve N.E.Br. present
- Conophytum ecarinatum L.Bolus var. angustum L.Bolus, accepted as Conophytum bilobum (Marloth) N.E.Br. subsp. bilobum var. bilobum, present
- Conophytum ecarinatum L.Bolus var. candidum (L.Bolus) Rawe, accepted as Conophytum meyeri N.E.Br. present
- Conophytum ectypum N.E.Br. indigenous
  - Conophytum ectypum N.E.Br. subsp. brownii (Tischer) S.A.Hammer, endemic
  - Conophytum ectypum N.E.Br. subsp. cruciatum S.A.Hammer, endemic
  - Conophytum ectypum N.E.Br. subsp. ectypum, endemic
  - Conophytum ectypum N.E.Br. subsp. ectypum var. brownii, accepted as Conophytum ectypum N.E.Br. subsp. brownii (Tischer) S.A.Hammer, present
  - Conophytum ectypum N.E.Br. subsp. ignavum S.A.Hammer, endemic
  - Conophytum ectypum N.E.Br. subsp. sulcatum (L.Bolus) S.A.Hammer, endemic
  - Conophytum ectypum N.E.Br. var. limbatum (N.E.Br.) Tischer, accepted as Conophytum ectypum N.E.Br. subsp. ectypum, present
  - Conophytum ectypum N.E.Br. var. tischleri (Schwantes) Tischer, accepted as Conophytum ectypum N.E.Br. subsp. ectypum, present
- Conophytum edithiae N.E.Br. accepted as Conophytum subfenestratum Schwantes, present
- Conophytum edwardii Schwantes, accepted as Conophytum piluliforme (N.E.Br.) N.E.Br. subsp. edwardii (Schwantes) S.A.Hammer, present
- Conophytum edwardsiae Lavis, accepted as Conophytum luckhoffii Lavis, present
- Conophytum edwardsiae Lavis var. albiflorum Rawe, accepted as Conophytum albiflorum (Rawe) S.A.Hammer, present
- Conophytum eenkokerense L.Bolus, accepted as Conophytum tantillum N.E.Br. subsp. eenkokerense (L.Bolus) S.A.Hammer, present
- Conophytum elegans N.E.Br. accepted as Conophytum pellucidum Schwantes subsp. pellucidum var. pellucidum, present
- Conophytum elishae (N.E.Br.) N.E.Br. accepted as Conophytum bilobum (Marloth) N.E.Br. subsp. bilobum var. elishae, present
- Conophytum ellipticum Tischer, accepted as Conophytum flavum N.E.Br. subsp. novicium (N.E.Br.) S.A.Hammer, present
- Conophytum elongatum Schick & Tischer, accepted as Conophytum hians N.E.Br. present
- Conophytum ernianum Loesch & Tischer, accepted as Conophytum taylorianum (Dinter & Schwantes) N.E.Br. subsp. ernianum (Loesch & Tischer) de Boer ex S. present
- Conophytum ernstii S.A.Hammer, indigenous
  - Conophytum ernstii S.A.Hammer subsp. ernstii, endemic
- Conophytum etaylorii Schwantes, accepted as Conophytum piluliforme (N.E.Br.) N.E.Br. subsp. piluliforme, present
- Conophytum excisum L.Bolus, accepted as Conophytum bilobum (Marloth) N.E.Br. subsp. bilobum var. bilobum, present
- Conophytum exiguum N.E.Br. accepted as Conophytum saxetanum (N.E.Br.) N.E.Br. present
- Conophytum exsertum N.E.Br. accepted as Conophytum bilobum (Marloth) N.E.Br. subsp. bilobum var. bilobum, present
- Conophytum fenestratum Schwantes, accepted as Conophytum pellucidum Schwantes subsp. pellucidum var. pellucidum, present
- Conophytum fibuliforme (Haw.) N.E.Br. endemic
- Conophytum ficiforme (Haw.) N.E.Br. endemic
  - Conophytum ficiforme (Haw.) N.E.Br. var. placitum (N.E.Br.) Rawe, accepted as Conophytum ficiforme (Haw.) N.E.Br. present
- Conophytum flavum N.E.Br. endemic
  - Conophytum flavum N.E.Br. subsp. flavum, endemic
  - Conophytum flavum N.E.Br. subsp. novicium (N.E.Br.) S.A.Hammer, endemic
  - Conophytum flavum N.E.Br. subsp. novicium (N.E.Br.) S.A.Hammer var. kosiesense, endemic
  - Conophytum flavum N.E.Br. subsp. novicium (N.E.Br.) S.A.Hammer var. novicium, endemic
  - Conophytum flavum N.E.Br. var. luteum (N.E.Br.) Boom, accepted as Conophytum flavum N.E.Br. subsp. flavum, present
- Conophytum forresteri L.Bolus, accepted as Conophytum pageae (N.E.Br.) N.E.Br. present
- Conophytum fossulatum Tischer, accepted as Conophytum ficiforme (Haw.) N.E.Br. present
- Conophytum fragile Tischer, accepted as Conophytum jucundum (N.E.Br.) N.E.Br. subsp. fragile (Tischer) S.A.Hammer, present
- Conophytum framesii Lavis, accepted as Conophytum uviforme (Haw.) N.E.Br. subsp. uviforme, present
- Conophytum francisci L.Bolus, accepted as Conophytum uviforme (Haw.) N.E.Br. subsp. uviforme, present
- Conophytum francoiseae (S.A.Hammer) S.A.Hammer, endemic
- Conophytum fraternum (N.E.Br.) N.E.Br. endemic
  - Conophytum fraternum (N.E.Br.) N.E.Br. var. leptanthum (L.Bolus) L.Bolus, accepted as Conophytum jucundum (N.E.Br.) N.E.Br. subsp. marlothii (N.E.Br.) S.A.Hammer, present
- Conophytum friedrichiae (Dinter) Schwantes, indigenous
- Conophytum frutescens Schwantes, endemic
- Conophytum fulleri L.Bolus, endemic
- Conophytum geometricum Lavis, accepted as Conophytum violaciflorum Schick & Tischer, present
- Conophytum geyeri L.Bolus, accepted as Conophytum jucundum (N.E.Br.) N.E.Br. subsp. jucundum, present
- Conophytum globosum (N.E.Br.) N.E.Br. endemic
  - Conophytum globosum (N.E.Br.) N.E.Br. var. vanbredae (L.Bolus) Rawe, accepted as Conophytum globosum (N.E.Br.) N.E.Br. present
- Conophytum gonapense L.Bolus, accepted as Conophytum bilobum (Marloth) N.E.Br. subsp. bilobum var. bilobum, present
  - Conophytum gonapense L.Bolus var. numeesicum L.Bolus, accepted as Conophytum bilobum (Marloth) N.E.Br. subsp. bilobum var. bilobum, present
- Conophytum gracile N.E.Br. accepted as Conophytum bilobum (Marloth) N.E.Br. subsp. altum (L.Bolus) S.A.Hammer, present
  - Conophytum gracile N.E.Br. var. majusculum L.Bolus, accepted as Conophytum bilobum (Marloth) N.E.Br. subsp. altum (L.Bolus) S.A.Hammer, present
- Conophytum graciliramosum L.Bolus, accepted as Conophytum bilobum (Marloth) N.E.Br. subsp. altum (L.Bolus) S.A.Hammer, present
- Conophytum gracilistylum (L.Bolus) N.E.Br. accepted as Conophytum bilobum (Marloth) N.E.Br. subsp. gracilistylum (L.Bolus) S.A.Hammer, present
- Conophytum graessneri Tischer, accepted as Conophytum saxetanum (N.E.Br.) N.E.Br. present
- Conophytum grandiflorum L.Bolus, accepted as Conophytum bilobum (Marloth) N.E.Br. subsp. bilobum var. bilobum, present
- Conophytum gratum (N.E.Br.) N.E.Br. accepted as Conophytum jucundum (N.E.Br.) N.E.Br.
  - Conophytum gratum (N.E.Br.) N.E.Br. subsp. marlothii (N.E.Br.) S.A.Hammer, accepted as Conophytum jucundum (N.E.Br.) N.E.Br. subsp. marlothii (N.E.Br.) S.A.Hammer, present
- Conophytum hallii L.Bolus, accepted as Conophytum roodiae N.E.Br. subsp. roodiae, present
- Conophytum hammeri G.Will. & H.C.Kenn. endemic
- Conophytum haramoepense (L.Bolus) G.D.Rowley, accepted as Conophytum lydiae (H.Jacobsen) G.D.Rowley, present
- Conophytum haramoepense L.Bolus, accepted as Conophytum marginatum Lavis subsp. haramoepense (L.Bolus) S.A.Hammer, present
- Conophytum heleniae Rawe, accepted as Conophytum tantillum N.E.Br. subsp. heleniae (Rawe) S.A.Hammer, present
- Conophytum helmutii Lavis, accepted as Conophytum stephanii Schwantes subsp. helmutii (Lavis) S.A.Hammer, present
- Conophytum hermarium (S.A.Hammer) S.A.Hammer, indigenous
- Conophytum herreanthus S.A.Hammer, indigenous
  - Conophytum herreanthus S.A.Hammer subsp. herreanthus, endemic
  - Conophytum herreanthus S.A.Hammer subsp. rex S.A.Hammer, endemic
- Conophytum herrei Schwantes, accepted as Conophytum minusculum (N.E.Br.) N.E.Br. subsp. minusculum, present
- Conophytum hians N.E.Br. endemic
  - Conophytum hians N.E.Br. var. acuminatum L.Bolus, accepted as Conophytum hians N.E.Br. present
- Conophytum hillii L.Bolus, accepted as Conophytum uviforme (Haw.) N.E.Br. subsp. uviforme, present
- Conophytum hirtum Schwantes, accepted as Conophytum hians N.E.Br. present
  - Conophytum hirtum Schwantes var. baradii Rawe, accepted as Conophytum klinghardtense Rawe subsp. baradii (Rawe) S.A.Hammer
- Conophytum hyracis S.A.Hammer, indigenous
- Conophytum inclusum L.Bolus, accepted as Conophytum bilobum (Marloth) N.E.Br. subsp. bilobum var. bilobum, present
- Conophytum incurvum N.E.Br. accepted as Conophytum bilobum (Marloth) N.E.Br. subsp. bilobum var. bilobum, present
  - Conophytum incurvum N.E.Br. var. leucanthum (Lavis) Tischer, accepted as Conophytum bilobum (Marloth) N.E.Br. subsp. bilobum var. bilobum, present
- Conophytum indefinitum L.Bolus, accepted as Conophytum bilobum (Marloth) N.E.Br. subsp. bilobum var. bilobum, present
- Conophytum indutum L.Bolus, accepted as Conophytum jucundum (N.E.Br.) N.E.Br. subsp. jucundum, present
- Conophytum inornatum N.E.Br. endemic
- Conophytum insigne L.Bolus, accepted as Conophytum bilobum (Marloth) N.E.Br. subsp. bilobum var. bilobum, present
- Conophytum intermedium L.Bolus, accepted as Conophytum loeschianum Tischer, present
- Conophytum intrepidum L.Bolus, accepted as Conophytum bolusiae Schwantes subsp. bolusiae, present
- Conophytum irmae S.A.Hammer & Barnhill, endemic
- Conophytum jacobsenianum Tischer, accepted as Conophytum jucundum (N.E.Br.) N.E.Br. subsp. jucundum, present
- Conophytum jarmilae Halda, endemic
- Conophytum johannis-winkleri (Dinter & Schwantes) N.E.Br. accepted as Conophytum pageae (N.E.Br.) N.E.Br. present
- Conophytum joubertii Lavis, endemic
- Conophytum jucundum (N.E.Br.) N.E.Br. indigenous
  - Conophytum jucundum (N.E.Br.) N.E.Br. subsp. fragile (Tischer) S.A.Hammer, endemic
  - Conophytum jucundum (N.E.Br.) N.E.Br. subsp. jucundum, indigenous
  - Conophytum jucundum (N.E.Br.) N.E.Br. subsp. marlothii (N.E.Br.) S.A.Hammer, endemic
  - Conophytum jucundum (N.E.Br.) N.E.Br. subsp. ruschii (Schwantes) S.A.Hammer, endemic
- Conophytum julii]] Schwantes ex H.Jacobsen, accepted as Conophytum uviforme (Haw.) N.E.Br. subsp. uviforme, present
- Conophytum kennedyi L.Bolus, accepted as Conophytum lithopsoides L.Bolus subsp. lithopsoides, present
- Conophytum khamiesbergense (L.Bolus) Schwantes, endemic
- Conophytum klaverense N.E.Br. accepted as Conophytum obcordellum (Haw.) N.E.Br. subsp. obcordellum var. obcordellum, present
- Conophytum klipbokbergense L.Bolus, accepted as Conophytum bilobum (Marloth) N.E.Br. subsp. bilobum var. bilobum, present
- Conophytum komkansicum L.Bolus, accepted as Conophytum calculus (A.Berger) N.E.Br. subsp. calculus, present
- Conophytum koubergense L.Bolus, accepted as Conophytum lithopsoides L.Bolus subsp. koubergense (L.Bolus) S.A.Hammer, present
- Conophytum kubusanum N.E.Br. endemic
- Conophytum labiatum Tischer, accepted as Conophytum pageae (N.E.Br.) N.E.Br. present
- Conophytum labyrintheum (N.E.Br.) N.E.Br. accepted as Conophytum minimum (Haw.) N.E.Br. present
- Conophytum lacteum L.Bolus, accepted as Conophytum bilobum (Marloth) N.E.Br. subsp. bilobum var. bilobum, present
- Conophytum laetum L.Bolus, accepted as Conophytum meyeri N.E.Br. present
  - Conophytum laetum L.Bolus var. extractum (Tischer) Rawe, accepted as Conophytum meyeri N.E.Br. present
- Conophytum lambertense Schick & Tischer, accepted as Conophytum obcordellum (Haw.) N.E.Br. present
  - Conophytum lambertense Schick & Tischer var. conspicuum Rawe, accepted as Conophytum obcordellum (Haw.) N.E.Br. subsp. obcordellum var. obcordellum, present
  - Conophytum lambertense Schick & Tischer var. rolfii (de Boer) Rawe, accepted as Conophytum obcordellum (Haw.) N.E.Br. subsp. rolfii (de Boer) S.A.Hammer, present
- Conophytum largum L.Bolus, accepted as Conophytum bilobum (Marloth) N.E.Br. subsp. bilobum var. bilobum, present
- Conophytum latum L.Bolus, accepted as Conophytum bilobum (Marloth) N.E.Br. subsp. bilobum var. bilobum, present
- Conophytum lavisianum L.Bolus, accepted as Conophytum bilobum (Marloth) N.E.Br. subsp. bilobum var. bilobum, present
- Conophytum lavranosii Rawe, accepted as Conophytum taylorianum (Dinter & Schwantes) N.E.Br. subsp. taylorianum, present
  - Conophytum lavranosii Rawe var. cuneatum Rawe, accepted as Conophytum taylorianum (Dinter & Schwantes) N.E.Br. subsp. taylorianum, present
- Conophytum laxipetalum N.E.Br. accepted as Conophytum bilobum (Marloth) N.E.Br. subsp. bilobum var. bilobum, present
- Conophytum leightoniae L.Bolus, accepted as Conophytum piluliforme (N.E.Br.) N.E.Br. subsp. piluliforme, present
- Conophytum leipoldtii N.E.Br. accepted as Conophytum minusculum (N.E.Br.) N.E.Br. subsp. leipoldtii (N.E.Br.) S.A.Hammer, present
- Conophytum lekkersingense L.Bolus, accepted as Conophytum bilobum (Marloth) N.E.Br. subsp. bilobum var. bilobum, present
- Conophytum leopardinum L.Bolus, accepted as Conophytum meyeri N.E.Br. present
- Conophytum leptanthum L.Bolus, accepted as Conophytum jucundum (N.E.Br.) N.E.Br. subsp. marlothii (N.E.Br.) S.A.Hammer, present
- Conophytum leucanthum Lavis, accepted as Conophytum bilobum (Marloth) N.E.Br. subsp. bilobum var. bilobum, present
  - Conophytum leucanthum Lavis var. multipetalum L.Bolus, accepted as Conophytum bilobum (Marloth) N.E.Br. subsp. bilobum var. bilobum, present
- Conophytum leviculum (N.E.Br.) N.E.Br. accepted as Conophytum minimum (Haw.) N.E.Br. present
- Conophytum lilianum Littlew. accepted as Conophytum pellucidum Schwantes subsp. pellucidum var. lilianum, present
- Conophytum limbatum N.E.Br. accepted as Conophytum ectypum N.E.Br. subsp. ectypum, present
- Conophytum limpidum S.A.Hammer, endemic
- Conophytum lindenianum Lavis & S.A.Hammer, accepted as Conophytum tantillum N.E.Br. subsp. lindenianum (Lavis & S.A.Hammer) S.A.Hammer, present
- Conophytum linearilucidum L.Bolus, accepted as Conophytum bilobum (Marloth) N.E.Br. subsp. bilobum var. linearilucidum, present
- Conophytum lithopsoides L.Bolus, indigenous
  - Conophytum lithopsoides L.Bolus subsp. arturolfago S.A.Hammer, accepted as Conophytum arthurolfago S.A.Hammer, present
  - Conophytum lithopsoides L.Bolus subsp. boreale (L.Bolus) S.A.Hammer, endemic
  - Conophytum lithopsoides L.Bolus subsp. koubergense (L.Bolus) S.A.Hammer, endemic
  - Conophytum lithopsoides L.Bolus subsp. lithopsoides, endemic
- Conophytum loeschianum Tischer, indigenous
- Conophytum longibracteatum L.Bolus, endemic
- Conophytum longistylum N.E.Br. accepted as Conophytum jucundum (N.E.Br.) N.E.Br. subsp. jucundum, present
- Conophytum longitubum L.Bolus, accepted as Conophytum truncatum (Thunb.) N.E.Br. subsp. viridicatum (N.E.Br.) S.A.Hammer, present
- Conophytum longum N.E.Br. endemic
- Conophytum lucipunctum N.E.Br. accepted as Conophytum subfenestratum Schwantes, present
- Conophytum luckhoffii Lavis, endemic
- Conophytum luisae Schwantes, accepted as Conophytum bilobum (Marloth) N.E.Br. subsp. altum (L.Bolus) S.A.Hammer, present
  - Conophytum luisae Schwantes var. papillatum L.Bolus, accepted as Conophytum bilobum (Marloth) N.E.Br. subsp. altum (L.Bolus) S.A.Hammer, present
- Conophytum luteolum L.Bolus, accepted as Conophytum flavum N.E.Br. subsp. novicium (N.E.Br.) S.A.Hammer, present
  - Conophytum luteolum L.Bolus var. macrostigma L.Bolus, accepted as Conophytum flavum N.E.Br. subsp. novicium (N.E.Br.) S.A.Hammer, present
- Conophytum lydiae (H.Jacobsen) G.D.Rowley, endemic
- Conophytum marginatum Lavis, indigenous
  - Conophytum marginatum Lavis subsp. haramoepense (L.Bolus) S.A.Hammer, endemic
  - Conophytum marginatum Lavis subsp. littlewoodii (L.Bolus) S.A.Hammer, indigenous
  - Conophytum marginatum Lavis subsp. marginatum, endemic
  - Conophytum marginatum Lavis var. eenkokerense (L.Bolus) Rawe, accepted as Conophytum tantillum N.E.Br. subsp. eenkokerense (L.Bolus) S.A.Hammer, present
  - Conophytum marginatum Lavis var. haramoepense (L.Bolus) Rawe, accepted as Conophytum marginatum Lavis subsp. haramoepense (L.Bolus) S.A.Hammer, present
  - Conophytum marginatum Lavis var. littlewoodii (L.Bolus) Rawe, accepted as Conophytum marginatum Lavis subsp. littlewoodii (L.Bolus) S.A.Hammer, present
- Conophytum markoetterae Schwantes, accepted as Conophytum bilobum (Marloth) N.E.Br. subsp. bilobum var. bilobum, present
- Conophytum marlothii N.E.Br. accepted as Conophytum jucundum (N.E.Br.) N.E.Br. subsp. marlothii (N.E.Br.) S.A.Hammer, present
- Conophytum marnierianum Tischer & Jacobsen, accepted as Conophytum hybrid, present
- Conophytum maughanii N.E.Br. indigenous
  - Conophytum maughanii N.E.Br. subsp. armeniacum S.A.Hammer, endemic
  - Conophytum maughanii N.E.Br. subsp. latum (Tischer) S.A.Hammer, endemic
  - Conophytum maughanii N.E.Br. subsp. maughanii, indigenous
- Conophytum maximum Tischer, accepted as Conophytum jucundum (N.E.Br.) N.E.Br. subsp. jucundum, present
- Conophytum meridianum L.Bolus, accepted as Conophytum pellucidum Schwantes subsp. cupreatum (Tischer) S.A.Hammer var. cupreatum, present
  - Conophytum meridianum L.Bolus var. pulverulentum L.Bolus, accepted as Conophytum pellucidum Schwantes subsp. cupreatum (Tischer) S.A.Hammer var. cupreatum, present
- Conophytum meyerae Schwantes, accepted as Conophytum bilobum (Marloth) N.E.Br. subsp. bilobum var. bilobum, present
  - Conophytum meyerae Schwantes forma alatum Tischer, accepted as Conophytum bilobum (Marloth) N.E.Br. subsp. bilobum var. bilobum, present
  - Conophytum meyerae Schwantes forma apiculatum (N.E.Br.) Tischer, accepted as Conophytum bilobum (Marloth) N.E.Br. subsp. bilobum var. bilobum, present
  - Conophytum meyerae Schwantes forma asperulum (L.Bolus) H.Jacobsen, accepted as Conophytum bilobum (Marloth) N.E.Br. subsp. bilobum var. bilobum, present
  - Conophytum meyerae Schwantes forma pole-evansii (N.E.Br.) Tischer, accepted as Conophytum bilobum (Marloth) N.E.Br. subsp. bilobum var. bilobum, present
- Conophytum meyeri N.E.Br. endemic
  - Conophytum meyeri N.E.Br. var. globuliforme (Schick & Tischer) Rawe, accepted as Conophytum meyeri N.E.Br. present
  - Conophytum meyeri N.E.Br. var. meyeri forma semilunulum, accepted as Conophytum meyeri N.E.Br. present
  - Conophytum meyeri N.E.Br. var. quinarium L.Bolus, accepted as Conophytum meyeri N.E.Br. present
  - Conophytum meyeri N.E.Br. var. ramosum (Lavis) Rawe, accepted as Conophytum meyeri N.E.Br. present
- Conophytum microstoma L.Bolus, accepted as Conophytum meyeri N.E.Br. present
- Conophytum middlemostii L.Bolus, accepted as Conophytum jucundum (N.E.Br.) N.E.Br. subsp. fragile (Tischer) S.A.Hammer, present
- Conophytum minimum (Haw.) N.E.Br. endemic
- Conophytum minusculum (N.E.Br.) N.E.Br. indigenous
  - Conophytum minusculum (N.E.Br.) N.E.Br. subsp. aestiflorens S.A.Hammer & Smale, endemic
  - Conophytum minusculum (N.E.Br.) N.E.Br. subsp. leipoldtii (N.E.Br.) S.A.Hammer, endemic
  - Conophytum minusculum (N.E.Br.) N.E.Br. subsp. minusculum, endemic
  - Conophytum minusculum (N.E.Br.) N.E.Br. var. paucilineatum Rawe, accepted as Conophytum minusculum (N.E.Br.) N.E.Br. subsp. minusculum, present
  - Conophytum minusculum (N.E.Br.) N.E.Br. var. reticulatum (L.Bolus) Rawe ex G.D.Rowley forma reticula, accepted as Conophytum minusculum (N.E.Br.) N.E.Br. subsp. minusculum, present
  - Conophytum minusculum (N.E.Br.) N.E.Br. var. reticulatum (L.Bolus) Rawe ex G.D.Rowley forma roseum, accepted as Conophytum minusculum (N.E.Br.) N.E.Br. subsp. minusculum, present
  - Conophytum minusculum (N.E.Br.) N.E.Br. var. roseum (G.D.Rowley) Tischer, accepted as Conophytum minusculum (N.E.Br.) N.E.Br. subsp. minusculum, present
- Conophytum minutiflorum (Schwantes) N.E.Br. accepted as Conophytum pageae (N.E.Br.) N.E.Br. present
- Conophytum minutum (Haw.) N.E.Br. indigenous
  - Conophytum minutum (Haw.) N.E.Br. forma sellatum (Tischer) Rawe, accepted as Conophytum minutum (Haw.) N.E.Br. var. minutum, present
  - Conophytum minutum (Haw.) N.E.Br. var. laxum Lavis, accepted as Conophytum minutum (Haw.) N.E.Br. var. minutum, present
  - Conophytum minutum (Haw.) N.E.Br. var. minutum, endemic
  - Conophytum minutum (Haw.) N.E.Br. var. nudum (Tischer) Boom, endemic
  - Conophytum minutum (Haw.) N.E.Br. var. pearsonii (N.E.Br.) Boom, endemic
  - Conophytum minutum (Haw.) N.E.Br. var. sellatum (Tischer) Boom, accepted as Conophytum minutum (Haw.) N.E.Br. var. minutum, present
- Conophytum mirabile A.R.Mitch. & S.A.Hammer, endemic
- Conophytum misellum N.E.Br. accepted as Conophytum saxetanum (N.E.Br.) N.E.Br. present
- Conophytum miserum N.E.Br. accepted as Conophytum hians N.E.Br. present
- Conophytum modestum L.Bolus, accepted as Conophytum quaesitum (N.E.Br.) N.E.Br. subsp. quaesitum var. quaesitum, present
- Conophytum muirii N.E.Br. accepted as Conophytum truncatum (Thunb.) N.E.Br. subsp. viridicatum (N.E.Br.) S.A.Hammer, present
- Conophytum multicolor Tischer, accepted as Conophytum obcordellum (Haw.) N.E.Br. subsp. obcordellum var. obcordellum, present
- Conophytum muscosipapillatum Lavis, accepted as Conophytum bilobum (Marloth) N.E.Br. subsp. bilobum var. muscosipapillatum, present
- Conophytum namibense N.E.Br. accepted as Conophytum saxetanum (N.E.Br.) N.E.Br. present
- Conophytum namiesicum L.Bolus, accepted as Conophytum calculus (A.Berger) N.E.Br. subsp. vanzylii (Lavis) S.A.Hammer, present
- Conophytum nanum Tischer, accepted as Conophytum meyeri N.E.Br. present
- Conophytum nelianum Schwantes, accepted as Conophytum bilobum (Marloth) N.E.Br. subsp. bilobum var. bilobum, present
- Conophytum nevillei (N.E.Br.) N.E.Br. accepted as Conophytum obcordellum (Haw.) N.E.Br. subsp. obcordellum var. obcordellum, present
- Conophytum noisabiense L.Bolus, accepted as Conophytum bilobum (Marloth) N.E.Br. subsp. bilobum var. bilobum, present
- Conophytum nordenstamii L.Bolus, accepted as Conophytum jucundum (N.E.Br.) N.E.Br. subsp. fragile (Tischer) S.A.Hammer, present
- Conophytum notabile N.E.Br. accepted as Conophytum frutescens Schwantes, present
- Conophytum notatum N.E.Br. accepted as Conophytum minimum (Haw.) N.E.Br. present
- Conophytum novellum N.E.Br. accepted as Conophytum truncatum (Thunb.) N.E.Br. subsp. viridicatum (N.E.Br.) S.A.Hammer, present
- Conophytum novicium N.E.Br. accepted as Conophytum flavum N.E.Br. subsp. novicium (N.E.Br.) S.A.Hammer, present
- Conophytum nutaboiense Tischer, accepted as Conophytum bilobum (Marloth) N.E.Br. subsp. bilobum var. bilobum, present
- Conophytum obconellum (Haw.) Schwantes, accepted as Conophytum obcordellum (Haw.) N.E.Br. subsp. obcordellum var. obcordellum, present
- Conophytum obcordellum (Haw.) N.E.Br. indigenous
  - Conophytum obcordellum (Haw.) N.E.Br. subsp. obcordellum var. ceresianum, endemic
  - Conophytum obcordellum (Haw.) N.E.Br. subsp. obcordellum var. obcordellum, endemic
  - Conophytum obcordellum (Haw.) N.E.Br. subsp. rolfii (de Boer) S.A.Hammer, endemic
  - Conophytum obcordellum (Haw.) N.E.Br. subsp. stenandrum (L.Bolus) S.A.Hammer, endemic
  - Conophytum obcordellum (Haw.) N.E.Br. var. germanum (N.E.Br.) Rawe, accepted as Conophytum obcordellum (Haw.) N.E.Br. subsp. obcordellum var. obcordellum, present
  - Conophytum obcordellum (Haw.) N.E.Br. var. mundum (N.E.Br.) Rawe forma mundum, accepted as Conophytum obcordellum (Haw.) N.E.Br. subsp. obcordellum var. obcordellum, present
  - Conophytum obcordellum (Haw.) N.E.Br. var. mundum (N.E.Br.) Rawe forma picturatum, accepted as Conophytum obcordellum (Haw.) N.E.Br. subsp. obcordellum var. obcordellum, present
  - Conophytum obcordellum (Haw.) N.E.Br. var. mundum (N.E.Br.) Rawe forma stayneri, accepted as Conophytum obcordellum (Haw.) N.E.Br. subsp. obcordellum var. ceresianum, present
  - Conophytum obcordellum (Haw.) N.E.Br. var. mundum (N.E.Br.) Rawe forma ursprungianum, accepted as Conophytum obcordellum (Haw.) N.E.Br. subsp. obcordellum var. obcordellum, present
- Conophytum obmetale (N.E.Br.) N.E.Br. accepted as Conophytum minimum (Haw.) N.E.Br. present
- Conophytum obovatum Lavis, accepted as Conophytum globosum (N.E.Br.) N.E.Br. present
  - Conophytum obovatum Lavis var. obtusum L.Bolus, accepted as Conophytum globosum (N.E.Br.) N.E.Br. present
- Conophytum obscurum N.E.Br. indigenous
  - Conophytum obscurum N.E.Br. subsp. barbatum (L.Bolus) S.A.Hammer, endemic
  - Conophytum obscurum N.E.Br. subsp. obscurum, endemic
  - Conophytum obscurum N.E.Br. subsp. sponsaliorum (S.A.Hammer) S.A.Hammer, endemic
  - Conophytum obscurum N.E.Br. subsp. vitreopapillum (Rawe) S.A.Hammer, endemic
- Conophytum obtusum N.E.Br. accepted as Conophytum bilobum (Marloth) N.E.Br. subsp. bilobum var. bilobum, present
  - Conophytum obtusum N.E.Br. var. amplum (L.Bolus) Rawe, accepted as Conophytum bilobum (Marloth) N.E.Br. subsp. bilobum var. bilobum, present
- Conophytum orbicum N.E.Br. ex Tischer, accepted as Conophytum jucundum (N.E.Br.) N.E.Br. subsp. jucundum, present
- Conophytum orientale L.Bolus, accepted as Conophytum truncatum (Thunb.) N.E.Br. subsp. truncatum var. truncatum, present
- Conophytum ornatum Lavis, accepted as Conophytum flavum N.E.Br. subsp. flavum, present
- Conophytum ovatum L.Bolus, accepted as Conophytum bilobum (Marloth) N.E.Br. subsp. bilobum var. bilobum, present
- Conophytum ovigerum Schwantes, accepted as Conophytum meyeri N.E.Br. present
- Conophytum pageae (N.E.Br.) N.E.Br. indigenous
  - Conophytum pageae (N.E.Br.) N.E.Br. var. albiflorum Rawe, accepted as Conophytum pageae (N.E.Br.) N.E.Br. present
  - Conophytum pageae (N.E.Br.) N.E.Br. var. pygmaeum (Schick & Tischer) Rawe, accepted as Conophytum stevens-jonesianum L.Bolus, present
- Conophytum pallidum (N.E.Br.) N.E.Br. accepted as Conophytum ficiforme (Haw.) N.E.Br. present
- Conophytum pardicolor Tischer, accepted as Conophytum pellucidum Schwantes subsp. pellucidum var. pellucidum, present
- Conophytum pardivisum Tischer, accepted as Conophytum uviforme (Haw.) N.E.Br. subsp. uviforme, present
- Conophytum parviflorum N.E.Br. accepted as Conophytum obcordellum (Haw.) N.E.Br. subsp. obcordellum var. obcordellum, present
- Conophytum parvulum L.Bolus, accepted as Conophytum bilobum (Marloth) N.E.Br. subsp. bilobum var. bilobum, present
- Conophytum paucipunctum Tischer, accepted as Conophytum breve N.E.Br. present
- Conophytum pauperae L.Bolus, accepted as Conophytum pageae (N.E.Br.) N.E.Br. present
- Conophytum pauxillum (N.E.Br.) N.E.Br. accepted as Conophytum minimum (Haw.) N.E.Br. present
- Conophytum pearsonii N.E.Br. accepted as Conophytum minutum (Haw.) N.E.Br. var. pearsonii (N.E.Br.) Boom
  - Conophytum pearsonii N.E.Br. var. latisectum L.Bolus, accepted as Conophytum minutum (Haw.) N.E.Br. var. pearsonii (N.E.Br.) Boom, present
  - Conophytum pearsonii N.E.Br. var. minor N.E.Br. accepted as Conophytum minutum (Haw.) N.E.Br. var. pearsonii (N.E.Br.) Boom, present
- Conophytum peersii Lavis, accepted as Conophytum truncatum (Thunb.) N.E.Br. subsp. truncatum var. truncatum, present
  - Conophytum peersii Lavis var. multipunctatum (Tischer) Rawe, accepted as Conophytum truncatum (Thunb.) N.E.Br. subsp. truncatum var. truncatum, present
- Conophytum pellucidum Schwantes, indigenous
  - Conophytum pellucidum Schwantes subsp. cupreatum (Tischer) S.A.Hammer var. cupreatum, endemic
  - Conophytum pellucidum Schwantes subsp. cupreatum (Tischer) S.A.Hammer var. terrestre, endemic
  - Conophytum pellucidum Schwantes subsp. pellucidum var. lilianum, endemic
  - Conophytum pellucidum Schwantes subsp. pellucidum var. neohallii, endemic
  - Conophytum pellucidum Schwantes subsp. pellucidum var. pellucidum, endemic
  - Conophytum pellucidum Schwantes subsp. pellucidum var. terricolor, endemic
  - Conophytum pellucidum Schwantes subsp. saueri S.A.Hammer & Smale, endemic
- Conophytum percrassum Schick & Tischer, accepted as Conophytum flavum N.E.Br. subsp. flavum, present
- Conophytum permaculatum Tischer, accepted as Conophytum truncatum (Thunb.) N.E.Br. subsp. truncatum var. wiggettiae, present
- Conophytum petraeum N.E.Br. accepted as Conophytum minimum (Haw.) N.E.Br. present
- Conophytum phoenicium S.A.Hammer, endemic
- Conophytum pictum (N.E.Br.) N.E.Br. accepted as Conophytum minimum (Haw.) N.E.Br. present
- Conophytum picturatum N.E.Br. accepted as Conophytum obcordellum (Haw.) N.E.Br. subsp. obcordellum var. obcordellum, present
- Conophytum pillansii Lavis, accepted as Conophytum subfenestratum Schwantes, present
- Conophytum piluliforme (N.E.Br.) N.E.Br. indigenous
  - Conophytum piluliforme (N.E.Br.) N.E.Br. subsp. edwardii (Schwantes) S.A.Hammer, endemic
  - Conophytum piluliforme (N.E.Br.) N.E.Br. subsp. piluliforme, endemic
  - Conophytum piluliforme (N.E.Br.) N.E.Br. var. advenum (N.E.Br.) Rawe, accepted as Conophytum piluliforme (N.E.Br.) N.E.Br. subsp. piluliforme, present
  - Conophytum piluliforme (N.E.Br.) N.E.Br. var. brevipetalum (Lavis) Rawe, accepted as Conophytum piluliforme (N.E.Br.) N.E.Br. subsp. piluliforme, present
- Conophytum piriforme L.Bolus, accepted as Conophytum bilobum (Marloth) N.E.Br. subsp. bilobum var. bilobum, present
- Conophytum pium S.A.Hammer, indigenous
- Conophytum placitum (N.E.Br.) N.E.Br. accepted as Conophytum ficiforme (Haw.) N.E.Br. present
  - Conophytum placitum (N.E.Br.) N.E.Br. var. pubescens Littlew. accepted as Conophytum ficiforme (Haw.) N.E.Br. present
- Conophytum plenum N.E.Br. accepted as Conophytum bilobum (Marloth) N.E.Br. subsp. bilobum var. bilobum, present
- Conophytum pluriforme L.Bolus, accepted as Conophytum bilobum (Marloth) N.E.Br. subsp. bilobum var. bilobum, present
- Conophytum poellnitzianum Schwantes, accepted as Conophytum pageae (N.E.Br.) N.E.Br. present
- Conophytum pole-evansii N.E.Br. accepted as Conophytum bilobum (Marloth) N.E.Br. subsp. bilobum var. bilobum, present
- Conophytum polulum N.E.Br. accepted as Conophytum minimum (Haw.) N.E.Br. present
- Conophytum polyandrum Lavis, accepted as Conophytum velutinum Schwantes subsp. polyandrum (Lavis) S.A.Hammer, present
- Conophytum praecinctum N.E.Br. accepted as Conophytum minimum (Haw.) N.E.Br. present
- Conophytum praecox N.E.Br. accepted as Conophytum fraternum (N.E.Br.) N.E.Br. present
- Conophytum praegratum Tischer, accepted as Conophytum jucundum (N.E.Br.) N.E.Br. subsp. jucundum, present
- Conophytum praeparvum N.E.Br. accepted as Conophytum uviforme (Haw.) N.E.Br. subsp. uviforme, present
  - Conophytum praeparvum N.E.Br. var. roseum Lavis, accepted as Conophytum uviforme (Haw.) N.E.Br. subsp. uviforme, present
- Conophytum praesectum N.E.Br. endemic
- Conophytum prolongatum L.Bolus, accepted as Conophytum uviforme (Haw.) N.E.Br. subsp. uviforme, present
- Conophytum proximum L.Bolus, accepted as Conophytum bilobum (Marloth) N.E.Br. subsp. bilobum var. bilobum, present
- Conophytum puberulum Lavis, accepted as Conophytum meyeri N.E.Br. present
- Conophytum pubescens (Tischer) G.D.Rowley, endemic
- Conophytum pubicalyx Lavis, endemic
- Conophytum pulchellum Tischer, accepted as Conophytum obscurum N.E.Br. subsp. obscurum, present
- Conophytum pumilum N.E.Br. accepted as Conophytum breve N.E.Br. present
- Conophytum purpusii (Schwantes) N.E.Br. accepted as Conophytum truncatum (Thunb.) N.E.Br. subsp. truncatum var. truncatum, present
- Conophytum pusillum (N.E.Br.) N.E.Br. accepted as Conophytum minimum (Haw.) N.E.Br. present
- Conophytum pygmaeum Schick & Tischer, accepted as Conophytum breve N.E.Br. present
- Conophytum quaesitum (N.E.Br.) N.E.Br. indigenous
  - Conophytum quaesitum (N.E.Br.) N.E.Br. subsp. quaesitum var. quaesitum, indigenous
  - Conophytum quaesitum (N.E.Br.) N.E.Br. subsp. quaesitum var. rostratum, endemic
- Conophytum quartziticum Tischer, accepted as Conophytum quaesitum (N.E.Br.) N.E.Br. subsp. quaesitum var. quaesitum, present
- Conophytum radiatum Tischer, accepted as Conophytum minimum (Haw.) N.E.Br. present
- Conophytum rarum N.E.Br. accepted as Conophytum jucundum (N.E.Br.) N.E.Br. subsp. jucundum, present
- Conophytum ratum S.A.Hammer, endemic
- Conophytum rauhii Tischer, accepted as Conophytum uviforme (Haw.) N.E.Br. subsp. rauhii (Tischer) S.A.Hammer, present
- Conophytum rawei G.D.Rowley, accepted as Conophytum longum N.E.Br. present
- Conophytum recisum N.E.Br. accepted as Conophytum bilobum (Marloth) N.E.Br. subsp. bilobum var. bilobum, present
- Conophytum reconditum A.R.Mitch. indigenous
  - Conophytum reconditum A.R.Mitch. subsp. buysianum (A.R.Mitch. & S.A.Hammer) S.A.Hammer, endemic
  - Conophytum reconditum A.R.Mitch. subsp. reconditum, endemic
- Conophytum regale Lavis, endemic
- Conophytum renniei Lavis, accepted as Conophytum truncatum (Thunb.) N.E.Br. subsp. truncatum var. truncatum, present
- Conophytum renominatum G.D.Rowley, accepted as Conophytum friedrichiae (Dinter) Schwantes, present
- Conophytum retusum N.E.Br. accepted as Conophytum meyeri N.E.Br. present
- Conophytum robustum Tischer, accepted as Conophytum jucundum (N.E.Br.) N.E.Br. subsp. jucundum, present
- Conophytum roodiae N.E.Br. indigenous
  - Conophytum roodiae N.E.Br. subsp. corrugatum Smale, endemic
  - Conophytum roodiae N.E.Br. subsp. cylindratum (Schwantes) Smale, endemic
  - Conophytum roodiae N.E.Br. subsp. roodiae, endemic
  - Conophytum roodiae N.E.Br. subsp. sanguineum (S.A.Hammer) Smale, endemic
- Conophytum rooipanense L.Bolus, accepted as Conophytum uviforme (Haw.) N.E.Br. subsp. uviforme, present
- Conophytum rostratum Tischer, accepted as Conophytum quaesitum (N.E.Br.) N.E.Br. subsp. quaesitum var. rostratum, present
- Conophytum rubricarinatum Tischer, accepted as Conophytum loeschianum Tischer, present
- Conophytum rubristylosum Tischer, accepted as Conophytum flavum N.E.Br. subsp. novicium (N.E.Br.) S.A.Hammer, present
- Conophytum rubrolineatum Rawe, accepted as Conophytum swanepoelianum Rawe subsp. rubrolineatum (Rawe) S.A.Hammer, present
- Conophytum rubroniveum L.Bolus, accepted as Conophytum roodiae N.E.Br. subsp. roodiae, present
- Conophytum rubrum L.Bolus, accepted as Conophytum piluliforme (N.E.Br.) N.E.Br. subsp. edwardii (Schwantes) S.A.Hammer, present
- Conophytum rufescens N.E.Br. accepted as Conophytum maughanii N.E.Br. subsp. maughanii, present
- Conophytum rugosum S.A.Hammer, endemic
  - Conophytum rugosum S.A.Hammer subsp. sanguineum S.A.Hammer, accepted as Conophytum roodiae N.E.Br. subsp. sanguineum (S.A.Hammer) Smale, present
- Conophytum ruschii Schwantes, accepted as Conophytum jucundum (N.E.Br.) N.E.Br. subsp. ruschii (Schwantes) S.A.Hammer, present
- Conophytum ruschii Schwantes var. obtusipetalum L.Bolus, accepted as Conophytum jucundum (N.E.Br.) N.E.Br. subsp. ruschii (Schwantes) S.A.Hammer, present
- Conophytum salmonicolor L.Bolus, accepted as Conophytum frutescens Schwantes, present
- Conophytum saxetanum (N.E.Br.) N.E.Br. indigenous
  - Conophytum saxetanum (N.E.Br.) N.E.Br. forma hallianum G.D.Rowley, accepted as Conophytum saxetanum (N.E.Br.) N.E.Br. present
  - Conophytum saxetanum (N.E.Br.) N.E.Br. var. loeschianum (Tischer) Rawe, accepted as Conophytum loeschianum Tischer, present
  - Conophytum saxetanum (N.E.Br.) N.E.Br. var. misellum (N.E.Br.) Rawe, accepted as Conophytum saxetanum (N.E.Br.) N.E.Br. present
- Conophytum schickianum Tischer, accepted as Conophytum pageae (N.E.Br.) N.E.Br. present
- Conophytum schlechteri Schwantes, endemic
- Conophytum schwantesii G.D.Rowley, accepted as Conophytum friedrichiae (Dinter) Schwantes, present
- Conophytum scitulum (N.E.Br.) N.E.Br. accepted as Conophytum minimum (Haw.) N.E.Br. present
- Conophytum semivestitum L.Bolus, endemic
- Conophytum senarium L.Bolus, accepted as Conophytum marginatum Lavis subsp. haramoepense (L.Bolus) S.A.Hammer, present
- Conophytum signatum (N.E.Br.) N.E.Br. accepted as Conophytum minimum (Haw.) N.E.Br. present
- Conophytum simile N.E.Br. accepted as Conophytum bilobum (Marloth) N.E.Br. subsp. bilobum var. bilobum, present
- Conophytum simplum N.E.Br. accepted as Conophytum bilobum (Marloth) N.E.Br. subsp. bilobum var. bilobum, present
- Conophytum singulare G.D.Rowley, accepted as Conophytum caroli Lavis, present
- Conophytum sitzlerianum Schwantes, accepted as Conophytum bilobum (Marloth) N.E.Br. subsp. bilobum var. bilobum, present
- Conophytum smithersii L.Bolus, accepted as Conophytum bilobum (Marloth) N.E.Br. subsp. bilobum var. bilobum, present
- Conophytum smorenskaduense de Boer, endemic
  - Conophytum smorenskaduense de Boer subsp. hermarium S.A.Hammer, accepted as Conophytum hermarium (S.A.Hammer) S.A.Hammer, present
- Conophytum sororium N.E.Br. accepted as Conophytum bilobum (Marloth) N.E.Br. subsp. bilobum var. bilobum, present
- Conophytum speciosum Tischer, accepted as Conophytum jucundum (N.E.Br.) N.E.Br. subsp. ruschii (Schwantes) S.A.Hammer, present
- Conophytum spectabile Lavis, accepted as Conophytum obcordellum (Haw.) N.E.Br. subsp. obcordellum var. obcordellum, present
- Conophytum spirale N.E.Br. accepted as Conophytum truncatum (Thunb.) N.E.Br. subsp. truncatum var. truncatum, present
- Conophytum springbokense N.E.Br. accepted as Conophytum bilobum (Marloth) N.E.Br. subsp. bilobum var. bilobum, present
- Conophytum stenandrum L.Bolus, accepted as Conophytum obcordellum (Haw.) N.E.Br. subsp. stenandrum (L.Bolus) S.A.Hammer, present
- Conophytum stephanii Schwantes, indigenous
  - Conophytum stephanii Schwantes subsp. abductum S.A.Hammer, accepted as Conophytum stephanii Schwantes subsp. stephanii, present
  - Conophytum stephanii Schwantes subsp. helmutii (Lavis) S.A.Hammer, endemic
  - Conophytum stephanii Schwantes subsp. stephanii, endemic
- Conophytum stevens-jonesianum L.Bolus, endemic
- Conophytum stipitatum L.Bolus, accepted as Conophytum uviforme (Haw.) N.E.Br. subsp. uviforme, present
- Conophytum strictum L.Bolus, accepted as Conophytum bilobum (Marloth) N.E.Br. subsp. bilobum var. bilobum, present
  - Conophytum strictum L.Bolus var. inaequale L.Bolus, accepted as Conophytum bilobum (Marloth) N.E.Br. subsp. bilobum var. bilobum, present
- Conophytum stylosum (N.E.Br.) Tischer, accepted as Conophytum bilobum (Marloth) N.E.Br. subsp. bilobum var. bilobum, present
- Conophytum subacutum L.Bolus, accepted as Conophytum bilobum (Marloth) N.E.Br. subsp. bilobum var. bilobum, present
- Conophytum subconfusum Tischer, accepted as Conophytum piluliforme (N.E.Br.) N.E.Br. subsp. piluliforme, present
- Conophytum subcylindricum L.Bolus, accepted as Conophytum bilobum (Marloth) N.E.Br. subsp. bilobum var. bilobum, present
- Conophytum subfenestratum Schwantes, endemic
- Conophytum subrisum (N.E.Br.) N.E.Br. accepted as Conophytum pageae (N.E.Br.) N.E.Br. present
- Conophytum subtenue L.Bolus, accepted as Conophytum bilobum (Marloth) N.E.Br. subsp. bilobum var. bilobum, present
- Conophytum subterraneum Smale & T.Jacobs, endemic
- Conophytum subtile N.E.Br. accepted as Conophytum breve N.E.Br. present
- Conophytum sulcatum L.Bolus, accepted as Conophytum ectypum N.E.Br. subsp. sulcatum (L.Bolus) S.A.Hammer, present
- Conophytum supremum L.Bolus, accepted as Conophytum bilobum (Marloth) N.E.Br. subsp. bilobum var. bilobum, present
- Conophytum swanepoelianum Rawe, indigenous
  - Conophytum swanepoelianum Rawe subsp. proliferans S.A.Hammer, endemic
  - Conophytum swanepoelianum Rawe subsp. rubrolineatum (Rawe) S.A.Hammer, endemic
  - Conophytum swanepoelianum Rawe subsp. swanepoelianum, endemic
- Conophytum tantillum N.E.Br. indigenous
  - Conophytum tantillum N.E.Br. subsp. amicorum S.A.Hammer & Barnhill, endemic
  - Conophytum tantillum N.E.Br. subsp. eenkokerense (L.Bolus) S.A.Hammer, endemic
  - Conophytum tantillum N.E.Br. subsp. heleniae (Rawe) S.A.Hammer, endemic
  - Conophytum tantillum N.E.Br. subsp. inexpectatum S.A.Hammer, endemic
  - Conophytum tantillum N.E.Br. subsp. lindenianum (Lavis & S.A.Hammer) S.A.Hammer, endemic
  - Conophytum tantillum N.E.Br. subsp. tantillum, endemic
- Conophytum taylorianum (Dinter & Schwantes) N.E.Br. indigenous
  - Conophytum taylorianum (Dinter & Schwantes) N.E.Br. subsp. rosynense S.A.Hammer, endemic
- Conophytum tectum N.E.Br. accepted as Conophytum bilobum (Marloth) N.E.Br. subsp. bilobum var. bilobum, present
- Conophytum teguliflorum Tischer, accepted as Conophytum frutescens Schwantes, present
- Conophytum tenuisectum L.Bolus, accepted as Conophytum pageae (N.E.Br.) N.E.Br. present
- Conophytum terrestre Tischer, accepted as Conophytum pellucidum Schwantes subsp. cupreatum (Tischer) S.A.Hammer var. terrestre, present
- Conophytum terricolor Tischer, accepted as Conophytum pellucidum Schwantes subsp. pellucidum var. terricolor, present
- Conophytum tetracarpum Lavis, accepted as Conophytum flavum N.E.Br. subsp. flavum, present
- Conophytum thudichumi L.Bolus, accepted as Conophytum pageae (N.E.Br.) N.E.Br. present
- Conophytum tinctum Lavis, accepted as Conophytum flavum N.E.Br. subsp. flavum, present
- Conophytum tischleri Schwantes, accepted as Conophytum ectypum N.E.Br. subsp. ectypum, present
- Conophytum tomasi Halda, endemic
- Conophytum translucens N.E.Br. accepted as Conophytum truncatum (Thunb.) N.E.Br. subsp. truncatum var. truncatum, present
- Conophytum triebneri Schwantes, accepted as Conophytum marginatum Lavis subsp. haramoepense (L.Bolus) S.A.Hammer, present
- Conophytum truncatum (Thunb.) N.E.Br. indigenous
  - Conophytum truncatum (Thunb.) N.E.Br. subsp. truncatum var. truncatum, endemic
  - Conophytum truncatum (Thunb.) N.E.Br. subsp. truncatum var. wiggettiae, endemic
  - Conophytum truncatum (Thunb.) N.E.Br. subsp. viridicatum (N.E.Br.) S.A.Hammer, endemic
  - Conophytum truncatum (Thunb.) N.E.Br. var. brevitubum (Lavis) Tischer, accepted as Conophytum truncatum (Thunb.) N.E.Br. subsp. truncatum var. truncatum, present
  - Conophytum truncatum (Thunb.) N.E.Br. var. truncatum forma parvipunctum, accepted as Conophytum truncatum (Thunb.) N.E.Br. subsp. truncatum var. truncatum, present
- Conophytum tubatum Tischer, accepted as Conophytum minutum (Haw.) N.E.Br. var. pearsonii (N.E.Br.) Boom, present
  - Conophytum tumidum N.E.Br. accepted as Conophytum bilobum (Marloth) N.E.Br. subsp. bilobum var. bilobum, present
  - Conophytum tumidum N.E.Br. var. asperulum L.Bolus, accepted as Conophytum bilobum (Marloth) N.E.Br. subsp. bilobum var. bilobum, present
- Conophytum turbiniforme Rawe, accepted as Conophytum auriflorum Tischer subsp. turbiniforme (Rawe) S.A.Hammer, present
- Conophytum turrigerum (N.E.Br.) N.E.Br. endemic
- Conophytum udabibense Loesch & Tischer, accepted as Conophytum pageae (N.E.Br.) N.E.Br. present
- Conophytum umdausense L.Bolus, accepted as Conophytum bilobum (Marloth) N.E.Br. subsp. bilobum var. bilobum, present
- Conophytum uviforme (Haw.) N.E.Br. indigenous
  - Conophytum uviforme (Haw.) N.E.Br. forma framesii (Lavis) Tischer, accepted as Conophytum uviforme (Haw.) N.E.Br. subsp. uviforme, present
  - Conophytum uviforme (Haw.) N.E.Br. forma meleagris (L.Bolus) Tischer, accepted as Conophytum uviforme (Haw.) N.E.Br. subsp. uviforme, present
  - Conophytum uviforme (Haw.) N.E.Br. subsp. decoratum (N.E.Br.) S.A.Hammer, endemic
  - Conophytum uviforme (Haw.) N.E.Br. subsp. rauhii (Tischer) S.A.Hammer, endemic
  - Conophytum uviforme (Haw.) N.E.Br. subsp. subincanum (Tischer) S.A.Hammer, endemic
  - Conophytum uviforme (Haw.) N.E.Br. subsp. uviforme, endemic
  - Conophytum uviforme (Haw.) N.E.Br. var. clarum (N.E.Br.) Rawe, accepted as Conophytum uviforme (Haw.) N.E.Br. subsp. uviforme, present
  - Conophytum uviforme (Haw.) N.E.Br. var. litorale (L.Bolus) Rawe, accepted as Conophytum uviforme (Haw.) N.E.Br. subsp. uviforme, present
  - Conophytum uviforme (Haw.) N.E.Br. var. occultum (L.Bolus) Rawe, accepted as Conophytum uviforme (Haw.) N.E.Br. subsp. uviforme, present
  - Conophytum uviforme (Haw.) N.E.Br. var. subincanum (Tischer) Rawe, accepted as Conophytum uviforme (Haw.) N.E.Br. subsp. uviforme, present
- Conophytum vagum N.E.Br. accepted as Conophytum minimum (Haw.) N.E.Br. present
- Conophytum vanbredae L.Bolus, accepted as Conophytum globosum (N.E.Br.) N.E.Br. present
- Conophytum vanheerdei Tischer, endemic
- Conophytum vanrhynsdorpense Schwantes, accepted as Conophytum uviforme (Haw.) N.E.Br. subsp. uviforme, present
- Conophytum vanzylii Lavis, accepted as Conophytum calculus (A.Berger) N.E.Br. subsp. vanzylii (Lavis) S.A.Hammer, present
- Conophytum variabile L.Bolus, accepted as Conophytum bilobum (Marloth) N.E.Br. subsp. bilobum var. bilobum, present
- Conophytum varians L.Bolus, accepted as Conophytum uviforme (Haw.) N.E.Br. subsp. decoratum (N.E.Br.) S.A.Hammer, present
- Conophytum velutinum Schwantes, indigenous
  - Conophytum velutinum Schwantes subsp. polyandrum (Lavis) S.A.Hammer, endemic
  - Conophytum velutinum Schwantes subsp. velutinum, endemic
  - Conophytum velutinum Schwantes var. craterulum (Tischer) Rawe, accepted as Conophytum velutinum Schwantes subsp. velutinum, present
- Conophytum verrucosum (Lavis) G.D.Rowley, endemic
- Conophytum vescum N.E.Br. accepted as Conophytum saxetanum (N.E.Br.) N.E.Br. present
- Conophytum violaciflorum Schick & Tischer, endemic
- Conophytum viride Tischer, accepted as Conophytum joubertii Lavis, present
- Conophytum viridicatum (N.E.Br.) N.E.Br. accepted as Conophytum truncatum (Thunb.) N.E.Br. subsp. viridicatum (N.E.Br.) S.A.Hammer, present
  - Conophytum viridicatum (N.E.Br.) N.E.Br. var. pisinnum (N.E.Br.) Rawe, accepted as Conophytum truncatum (Thunb.) N.E.Br. subsp. viridicatum (N.E.Br.) S.A.Hammer, present
- Conophytum vitreopapillum Rawe, accepted as Conophytum obscurum N.E.Br. subsp. vitreopapillum (Rawe) S.A.Hammer, present
- Conophytum vlakmynense L.Bolus, accepted as Conophytum bilobum (Marloth) N.E.Br. subsp. bilobum var. bilobum, present
- Conophytum wettsteinii (A.Berger) N.E.Br. endemic
  - Conophytum wettsteinii (A.Berger) N.E.Br. subsp. fragile (Tischer) S.A.Hammer, accepted as Conophytum jucundum (N.E.Br.) N.E.Br. subsp. fragile (Tischer) S.A.Hammer, present
  - Conophytum wettsteinii (A.Berger) N.E.Br. subsp. francoiseae S.A.Hammer, accepted as Conophytum francoiseae (S.A.Hammer) S.A.Hammer, present
  - Conophytum wettsteinii (A.Berger) N.E.Br. subsp. ruschii (Schwantes) S.A.Hammer, accepted as Conophytum jucundum (N.E.Br.) N.E.Br. subsp. ruschii (Schwantes) S.A.Hammer, present
  - Conophytum wettsteinii (A.Berger) N.E.Br. var. oculatum L.Bolus, accepted as Conophytum jucundum (N.E.Br.) N.E.Br. subsp. ruschii (Schwantes) S.A.Hammer, present
  - Conophytum wettsteinii (A.Berger) N.E.Br. var. speciosum (Tischer) Tischer, accepted as Conophytum jucundum (N.E.Br.) N.E.Br. subsp. ruschii (Schwantes) S.A.Hammer, present
- Conophytum wittebergense de Boer, accepted as Conophytum minimum (Haw.) N.E.Br. present

== Corpuscularia ==
Genus Corpuscularia:

- Corpuscularia angustifolia (L.Bolus) H.E.K.Hartmann, endemic
- Corpuscularia angustipetala (Lavis) H.E.K.Hartmann, endemic
- Corpuscularia appressa (L.Bolus) H.E.K.Hartmann, endemic
- Corpuscularia britteniae (L.Bolus) H.E.K.Hartmann, endemic
- Corpuscularia cymbiformis (Haw.) Schwantes, endemic
- Corpuscularia gracilis (L.Bolus) H.E.K.Hartmann, accepted as Corpuscularia gracillima (L.Bolus) Niederle, endemic
- Corpuscularia gracillima (L.Bolus) Niederle, endemic
- Corpuscularia lehmannii (Eckl. & Zeyh.) Schwantes, endemic
- Corpuscularia taylori (N.E.Br.) Schwantes, endemic

== Cryophytum ==
Genus Cryophytum:

- Cryophytum aitonis (Jacq.) N.E.Br. accepted as Mesembryanthemum aitonis Jacq. indigenous
- Cryophytum angulatum (Thunb.) Schwantes, accepted as Mesembryanthemum aitonis Jacq. indigenous
- Cryophytum barklyi (N.E.Br.) N.E.Br. ex L.Bolus, accepted as Mesembryanthemum barklyi N.E.Br. indigenous
- Cryophytum bijliae N.E.Br. accepted as Mesembryanthemum aitonis Jacq. indigenous
- Cryophytum burchellii N.E.Br. accepted as Mesembryanthemum aitonis Jacq. indigenous
- Cryophytum clandestinum (Haw.) L.Bolus, accepted as Mesembryanthemum clandestinum Haw. indigenous
- Cryophytum conjectum N.E.Br. accepted as Mesembryanthemum clandestinum Haw. indigenous
- Cryophytum crystallinum (L.) N.E.Br. accepted as Mesembryanthemum crystallinum L. indigenous
- Cryophytum gariusanum Dinter ex Range, accepted as Mesembryanthemum gariusanum Dinter, indigenous
- Cryophytum guerichianum (Pax) Schwantes, accepted as Mesembryanthemum guerichianum Pax, indigenous
- Cryophytum inachabense (Engl.) N.E.Br. accepted as Mesembryanthemum inachabense Engl. indigenous
- Cryophytum intermedium L.Bolus, accepted as Mesembryanthemum longistylum DC. indigenous
- Cryophytum lineare L.Bolus, accepted as Mesembryanthemum longistylum DC. indigenous
- Cryophytum neglectum N.E.Br. accepted as Mesembryanthemum longistylum DC. indigenous
- Cryophytum neilsoniae L.Bolus, accepted as Mesembryanthemum guerichianum Pax, indigenous
- Cryophytum nodiflorum (L.) L.Bolus, accepted as Mesembryanthemum nodiflorum L. indigenous
- Cryophytum paulum N.E.Br. accepted as Mesembryanthemum paulum (N.E.Br.) L.Bolus, indigenous
- Cryophytum planum L.Bolus, accepted as Mesembryanthemum paulum (N.E.Br.) L.Bolus, indigenous
- Cryophytum stenandrum L.Bolus, accepted as Mesembryanthemum stenandrum (L.Bolus) L.Bolus, indigenous
- Cryophytum suaveolens (L.Bolus) J.W.Ingram, accepted as Mesembryanthemum lignescens (L.Bolus) Klak, indigenous
- Cryophytum suffruticosum L.Bolus, accepted as Mesembryanthemum suffruticosum (L.Bolus) Klak, endemic

== Cylindrophyllum ==
Genus Cylindrophyllum:

- Cylindrophyllum calamiforme (L.) Schwantes, endemic
- Cylindrophyllum comptonii L.Bolus, endemic
- Cylindrophyllum dyeri L.Bolus, accepted as Cylindrophyllum calamiforme (L.) Schwantes, present
- Cylindrophyllum hallii L.Bolus, endemic
- Cylindrophyllum obsubulatum (Haw.) Schwantes, endemic
- Cylindrophyllum tugwelliae L.Bolus, endemic

== Dactylopsis ==
Genus Dactylopsis:

- Dactylopsis digitata (Aiton) N.E.Br. accepted as Mesembryanthemum digitatum Aiton subsp. digitatum, endemic
  - Dactylopsis digitata (Aiton) N.E.Br. subsp. littlewoodii (L.Bolus) Klak, accepted as Mesembryanthemum digitatum Aiton subsp. littlewoodii (L.Bolus) Klak, endemic
- Dactylopsis littlewoodii L.Bolus, accepted as Mesembryanthemum digitatum Aiton subsp. littlewoodii (L.Bolus) Klak, endemic

== Deilanthe ==
Genus Deilanthe:

- Deilanthe hilmarii (L.Bolus) H.E.K.Hartmann, endemic
- Deilanthe peersii (L.Bolus) N.E.Br. endemic
- Deilanthe thudichumii (L.Bolus) S.A.Hammer, endemic

== Delosperma ==
Genus Delosperma:

- Delosperma abbottii Van Jaarsv. endemic
- Delosperma aberdeenense (L.Bolus) L.Bolus, endemic
- Delosperma acocksii L.Bolus, endemic
  - Delosperma acocksii L.Bolus var. luxurians L.Bolus, accepted as Delosperma acocksii L.Bolus, present
- Delosperma acuminatum L.Bolus, endemic
- Delosperma adelaidense Lavis, endemic
- Delosperma aereum (L.Bolus) L.Bolus, endemic
  - Delosperma aereum (L.Bolus) L.Bolus var. album (L.Bolus) L.Bolus, accepted as Delosperma aereum (L.Bolus) L.Bolus, present
- Delosperma affine Lavis, indigenous
- Delosperma algoense L.Bolus, endemic
- Delosperma aliwalense L.Bolus, endemic
- Delosperma alpinum (N.E.Br.) S.A.Hammer & A.P.Dold, endemic
- Delosperma alticola L.Bolus, endemic
- Delosperma angustifolium L.Bolus, accepted as Corpuscularia angustifolia (L.Bolus) H.E.K.Hartmann, present
- Delosperma angustipetalum Lavis, accepted as Corpuscularia angustipetala (Lavis) H.E.K.Hartmann, present
- Delosperma annulare L.Bolus, endemic
- Delosperma appressum L.Bolus, accepted as Corpuscularia appressa (L.Bolus) H.E.K.Hartmann, present
- Delosperma ashtonii L.Bolus, indigenous
- Delosperma asperulum (Salm-Dyck) L.Bolus, accepted as Drosanthemum asperulum (Salm-Dyck) Schwantes, present
- Delosperma ausense L.Bolus, accepted as Delosperma klinghardtianum (Dinter) Schwantes, present
- Delosperma brevipetalum L.Bolus, endemic
- Delosperma brevisepalum L.Bolus, endemic
  - Delosperma brevisepalum L.Bolus var. majus L.Bolus, accepted as Delosperma brevisepalum L.Bolus, present
- Delosperma britteniae L.Bolus, accepted as Corpuscularia britteniae (L.Bolus) H.E.K.Hartmann, present
- Delosperma brunnthaleri (A.Berger) Schwantes, endemic
- Delosperma burtoniae L.Bolus, endemic
- Delosperma caespitosum L.Bolus, endemic
  - Delosperma caespitosum L.Bolus forma roseum (L.Bolus) L.Bolus, accepted as Delosperma caespitosum L.Bolus, present
- Delosperma calitzdorpense L.Bolus, endemic
- Delosperma calycinum L.Bolus, endemic
- Delosperma carolinense N.E.Br. indigenous
  - Delosperma carolinense N.E.Br. var. compacta L.Bolus, accepted as Delosperma carolinense N.E.Br. present
- Delosperma carterae L.Bolus, endemic
- Delosperma clavipes Lavis, indigenous
- Delosperma cloeteae Lavis, endemic
- Delosperma concavum L.Bolus, indigenous
- Delosperma congestum L.Bolus, indigenous
- Delosperma cooperi (Hook.f.) L.Bolus, indigenous
  - Delosperma cooperi (Hook.f.) L.Bolus forma bicolor (L.Bolus) G.D.Rowley, accepted as Delosperma cooperi (Hook.f.) L.Bolus, present
- Delosperma crassuloides (Haw.) L.Bolus, indigenous
- Delosperma crassum L.Bolus, endemic
- Delosperma cronemeyerianum (A.Berger) H.Jacobsen, endemic
- Delosperma davyi N.E.Br. endemic
- Delosperma deilanthoides S.A.Hammer, endemic
- Delosperma deleeuwiae Lavis, indigenous
- Delosperma denticulatum L.Bolus, endemic
- Delosperma dolomiticum Van Jaarsv. accepted as Delosperma vandermerwei L.Bolus, present
- Delosperma dunense L.Bolus, endemic
- Delosperma dyeri L.Bolus, endemic
  - Delosperma dyeri L.Bolus var. laxum L.Bolus, accepted as Delosperma dyeri L.Bolus, present
- Delosperma echinatum (Aiton) Schwantes, accepted as Delosperma echinatum (Lam.) Schwantes, present
- Delosperma echinatum (Lam.) Schwantes, endemic
- Delosperma ecklonis (Salm-Dyck) Schwantes, endemic
  - Delosperma ecklonis (Salm-Dyck) Schwantes var. latifolia L.Bolus, accepted as Delosperma ecklonis (Salm-Dyck) Schwantes, present
- Delosperma edwardsiae L.Bolus, accepted as Delosperma rogersii (Schonland & A.Berger) L.Bolus, present
- Delosperma erectum L.Bolus, endemic
- Delosperma esterhuyseniae L.Bolus, endemic
- Delosperma exspersum (N.E.Br.) L.Bolus, accepted as Drosanthemum expersum (N.E.Br.) Schwantes, present
  - Delosperma exspersum (N.E.Br.) L.Bolus var. decumbens L.Bolus, accepted as Drosanthemum expersum (N.E.Br.) Schwantes, present
- Delosperma ficksburgense Lavis, endemic
- Delosperma floribundum L.Bolus, endemic
- Delosperma framesii L.Bolus, endemic
- Delosperma fredericii Lavis, endemic
- Delosperma frutescens L.Bolus, endemic
- Delosperma galpinii L.Bolus, indigenous
  - Delosperma galpinii L.Bolus var. minus L.Bolus, accepted as Delosperma galpinii L.Bolus, present
- Delosperma gautengense H.E.K.Hartmann, endemic
- Delosperma giffenii Lavis, endemic
- Delosperma gracile L.Bolus, endemic
- Delosperma gracillimum L.Bolus, accepted as Corpuscularia gracillima (L.Bolus) Niederle, endemic
- Delosperma gramineum L.Bolus, endemic
- Delosperma grandiflorum L.Bolus, accepted as Drosanthemum longipes (L.Bolus) H.E.K.Hartmann, present
- Delosperma grantiae L.Bolus, endemic
- Delosperma gratiae L.Bolus, endemic
- Delosperma guthriei Lavis, endemic
- Delosperma hallii L.Bolus, accepted as Hartmanthus halii (L.Bolus) S.A.Hammer, present
- Delosperma herbeum (N.E.Br.) N.E.Br. indigenous
- Delosperma hirtum (N.E.Br.) Schwantes, indigenous
  - Delosperma hirtum (N.E.Br.) Schwantes var. bicolor L.Bolus, accepted as Delosperma hirtum (N.E.Br.) Schwantes, present
- Delosperma hollandii L.Bolus, endemic
- Delosperma imbricatum L.Bolus, endemic
- Delosperma inaequale L.Bolus, endemic
- Delosperma incomptum (Haw.) L.Bolus, endemic
  - Delosperma incomptum (Haw.) L.Bolus var. ecklonis (Salm-Dyck) H.Jacobsen, accepted as Delosperma invalidum (N.E.Br.) H.E.K.Hartmann, present
  - Delosperma incomptum (Haw.) L.Bolus var. gracile L.Bolus, accepted as Delosperma incomptum (Haw.) L.Bolus, present
- Delosperma inconspicuum L.Bolus, endemic
- Delosperma intonsum L.Bolus, endemic
- Delosperma invalidum (N.E.Br.) H.E.K.Hartmann, endemic
- Delosperma jansei N.E.Br. endemic
- Delosperma karrooicum L.Bolus, endemic
- Delosperma katbergense L.Bolus, endemic
  - Delosperma katbergense L.Bolus var. amatolense L.Bolus, accepted as Delosperma katbergense L.Bolus, present
  - Delosperma katbergense L.Bolus var. angustifolium L.Bolus, accepted as Delosperma katbergense L.Bolus, present
- Delosperma klinghardtianum (Dinter) Schwantes, indigenous
- Delosperma knox-daviesii Lavis, endemic
- Delosperma kofleri Lavis, indigenous
- Delosperma lavisiae L.Bolus, indigenous
  - Delosperma lavisiae L.Bolus var. parisepalum L.Bolus, accepted as Delosperma lavisiae L.Bolus
- Delosperma laxipetalum L.Bolus, endemic
- Delosperma lebomboense (L.Bolus) Lavis, indigenous
- Delosperma leendertziae N.E.Br. endemic
- Delosperma lehmannii (Eckl. & Zeyh.) Schwantes, accepted as Corpuscularia lehmannii (Eckl. & Zeyh.) Schwantes, present
- Delosperma leightoniae Lavis, endemic
- Delosperma liebenbergii L.Bolus, endemic
- Delosperma lineare L.Bolus, indigenous
  - Delosperma lineare L.Bolus var. tenuifolium L.Bolus, accepted as Delosperma lineare L.Bolus
- Delosperma litorale (Kensit) L.Bolus, endemic
- Delosperma longipes L.Bolus, accepted as Drosanthemum longipes (L.Bolus) H.E.K.Hartmann, present
- Delosperma lootsbergense Lavis, endemic
- Delosperma luckhoffii L.Bolus, endemic
- Delosperma luteum L.Bolus, endemic
- Delosperma lydenburgense L.Bolus, endemic
  - Delosperma lydenburgense L.Bolus var. acutipetalum L.Bolus, accepted as Delosperma lydenburgense L.Bolus, present
- Delosperma macellum (N.E.Br.) N.E.Br. indigenous
- Delosperma macrostigma L.Bolus, endemic
- Delosperma mahonii (N.E.Br.) N.E.Br. indigenous
- Delosperma mariae L.Bolus, endemic
- Delosperma maxwelliae L.Bolus, endemic
- Delosperma minimum Lavis, accepted as Corpuscularia taylori (N.E.Br.) Schwantes, present
- Delosperma monanthemum Lavis, endemic
- Delosperma muiri L.Bolus, endemic
- Delosperma multiflorum L.Bolus, endemic
- Delosperma neethlingiae (L.Bolus) Schwantes, endemic
- Delosperma nubigenum (Schltr.) L.Bolus, indigenous
- Delosperma obtusum L.Bolus, endemic
- Delosperma ornatulum N.E.Br. endemic
- Delosperma pachyrhizum L.Bolus, indigenous
  - Delosperma pachyrhizum L.Bolus var. pubescens L.Bolus, accepted as Delosperma pachyrhizum L.Bolus, present
- Delosperma pageanum (L.Bolus) L.Bolus, endemic
- Delosperma pallidum L.Bolus, endemic
- Delosperma papillatum (L.Bolus) L.Bolus, accepted as Drosanthemum papillatum L.Bolus, present
- Delosperma parviflorum L.Bolus, endemic
- Delosperma patersoniae (L.Bolus) L.Bolus, endemic
- Delosperma peersii Lavis, endemic
- Delosperma peglerae L.Bolus, endemic
- Delosperma pergamentaceum L.Bolus, accepted as Hartmanthus pergamentaceus (L.Bolus) S.A.Hammer, present
  - Delosperma pergamentaceum L.Bolus var. roseum Lavis, accepted as Hartmanthus pergamentaceus (L.Bolus) S.A.Hammer, present
- Delosperma platysepalum L.Bolus, endemic
- Delosperma pondoense L.Bolus, endemic
- Delosperma pontii L.Bolus, accepted as Delosperma floribundum L.Bolus, present
- Delosperma pottsii (L.Bolus) L.Bolus, endemic
- Delosperma prasinum L.Bolus, endemic
- Delosperma pruinosum (Thunb.) J.W.Ingram, accepted as Delosperma echinatum (Lam.) Schwantes, present
- Delosperma pubipetalum L.Bolus, accepted as Drosanthemum papillatum L.Bolus, present
- Delosperma purpureum H.E.K.Hartmann, endemic
- Delosperma repens L.Bolus, endemic
- Delosperma reynoldsii Lavis, indigenous
- Delosperma rileyi L.Bolus, endemic
- Delosperma robustum L.Bolus, endemic
- Delosperma rogersii (Schonland & A.Berger) L.Bolus, endemic
  - Delosperma rogersii (Schonland & A.Berger) L.Bolus var. glabrescens L.Bolus, accepted as Delosperma rogersii (Schonland & A.Berger) L.Bolus, present
- Delosperma roseopurpureum Lavis, indigenous
- Delosperma saturatum L.Bolus, endemic
- Delosperma saxicola Lavis, endemic
- Delosperma scabripes L.Bolus, indigenous
- Delosperma smythae L.Bolus, endemic
- Delosperma sphalmanthoides S.A.Hammer, endemic
- Delosperma stenandrum L.Bolus, endemic
- Delosperma subclavatum L.Bolus, endemic
- Delosperma subincanum (Haw.) Schwantes, endemic
- Delosperma subpetiolatum L.Bolus, endemic
- Delosperma sulcatum L.Bolus, endemic
- Delosperma sutherlandii (Hook.f.) N.E.Br. endemic
- Delosperma suttoniae Lavis, endemic
- Delosperma taylori (N.E.Br.) Schwantes, accepted as Corpuscularia taylori (N.E.Br.) Schwantes, present
  - Delosperma taylori (N.E.Br.) Schwantes var. albanense L.Bolus, accepted as Corpuscularia taylori (N.E.Br.) Schwantes, present
- Delosperma testaceum (Haw.) Schwantes, endemic
- Delosperma tradescantioides (A.Berger) L.Bolus, indigenous
- Delosperma truteri Lavis, endemic
- Delosperma uitenhagense L.Bolus, endemic
- Delosperma uncinatum L.Bolus, endemic
- Delosperma uniflorum L.Bolus, endemic
- Delosperma vandermerwei L.Bolus, endemic
- Delosperma velutinum L.Bolus, indigenous
- Delosperma verecundum L.Bolus, endemic
- Delosperma vernicolor L.Bolus, endemic
- Delosperma versicolor L.Bolus, endemic
- Delosperma vinaceum (L.Bolus) L.Bolus, endemic
- Delosperma virens L.Bolus, endemic
- Delosperma vogtsii L.Bolus, endemic
- Delosperma waterbergense L.Bolus, endemic
- Delosperma wethamae L.Bolus, indigenous
- Delosperma wilmaniae Lavis, endemic
- Delosperma wiumii Lavis, endemic
- Delosperma zeederbergii L.Bolus, endemic
- Delosperma zoeae L.Bolus, endemic
- Delosperma zoutpansbergense L.Bolus, endemic

== Dicrocaulon ==
Genus Dicrocaulon:

- Dicrocaulon brevifolium N.E.Br. endemic
- Dicrocaulon grandiflorum Ihlenf. endemic
- Dicrocaulon humile N.E.Br. endemic
- Dicrocaulon microstigma (L.Bolus) Ihlenf. endemic
- Dicrocaulon nodosum (A.Berger) N.E.Br. endemic
- Dicrocaulon ramulosum (L.Bolus) Ihlenf. endemic
- Dicrocaulon spissum N.E.Br. endemic
- Dicrocaulon trichotomum (Thunb.) N.E.Br. accepted as Mesembryanthemum trichotomum Thunb. indigenous

== Didymaotus ==
Genus Didymaotus:

- Didymaotus lapidiformis (Marloth) N.E.Br. endemic

== Dinteranthus ==
Genus Dinteranthus:

- Dinteranthus microspermus (Dinter & Derenb.) Schwantes subsp. puberulus (N.E.Br.) N.Sauer, accepted as Dinteranthus puberulus N.E.Br.
- Dinteranthus microspermus (Dinter & Derenb.) Schwantes var. acutipetalus L.Bolus, accepted as Dinteranthus puberulus N.E.Br.
- Dinteranthus pole-evansii (N.E.Br.) Schwantes, endemic
- Dinteranthus puberulus N.E.Br. endemic
- Dinteranthus vanzylii (L.Bolus) Schwantes, endemic
- Dinteranthus wilmotianus L.Bolus, endemic
  - Dinteranthus wilmotianus L.Bolus subsp. impunctatus N.Sauer, accepted as Dinteranthus inexpectatus Dinter ex H.Jacobsen, present

== Diplosoma ==
Genus Diplosoma:

- Diplosoma luckhoffii (L.Bolus) Schwantes ex Ihlenf. endemic
- Diplosoma retroversum (Kensit) Schwantes, endemic

== Disphyma ==
Genus Disphyma:

- Disphyma crassifolium (L.) L.Bolus, endemic
- Disphyma dunsdonii L.Bolus, endemic

== Dorotheanthus ==
Genus Dorotheanthus:

- Dorotheanthus apetalus (L.f.) N.E.Br. accepted as Cleretum apetalum (L.f.) N.E.Br. endemic
- Dorotheanthus bellidiformis (Burm.f.) N.E.Br. accepted as Cleretum bellidiforme (Burm.f.) G.D.Rowley, present
  - Dorotheanthus bellidiformis (Burm.f.) N.E.Br. subsp. hestermalensis Ihlenf. & Struck, accepted as Cleretum bellidiforme (Burm.f.) G.D.Rowley, endemic
- Dorotheanthus booysenii L.Bolus, accepted as Cleretum booysenii (L.Bolus) Klak, endemic
- Dorotheanthus clavatus (Haw.) Struck, accepted as Cleretum clavatum (Haw.) Klak, endemic
- Dorotheanthus gramineus (Haw.) Schwantes, accepted as Cleretum apetalum (L.f.) N.E.Br. present
- Dorotheanthus maughanii (N.E.Br.) Ihlenf. & Struck, accepted as Cleretum maughanii (N.E.Br.) Klak, endemic
- Dorotheanthus rourkei L.Bolus, accepted as Cleretum rourkei (L.Bolus) Klak, endemic
- Dorotheanthus ulularis Brusse, endemic

== Dracophilus ==
Genus Dracophilus:

- Dracophilus dealbatus (N.E.Br.) Walgate, indigenous
- Dracophilus montis-draconis (Dinter) Dinter & Schwantes, accepted as Dracophilus dealbatus (N.E.Br.) Walgate
- Dracophilus proximus (L.Bolus) Walgate, accepted as Dracophilus dealbatus (N.E.Br.) Walgate, present

== Drosanthemopsis ==
Genus Drosanthemopsis:

- Drosanthemopsis salaria (L.Bolus) Rauschert, accepted as Jacobsenia vaginata (L.Bolus) Ihlenf. present
- Drosanthemopsis vaginata (L.Bolus) Rauschert, accepted as Jacobsenia vaginata (L.Bolus) Ihlenf. present

== Drosanthemum ==
Genus Drosanthemum:

- Drosanthemum acuminatum L.Bolus, endemic
- Drosanthemum acutifolium (L.Bolus) L.Bolus, endemic
- Drosanthemum albens L.Bolus, indigenous
- Drosanthemum albiflorum (L.Bolus) Schwantes, endemic
- Drosanthemum ambiguum L.Bolus, endemic
- Drosanthemum anomalum L.Bolus, endemic
- Drosanthemum archeri L.Bolus, endemic
- Drosanthemum asperulum (Salm-Dyck) Schwantes, endemic
- Drosanthemum attenuatum (Haw.) Schwantes, endemic
- Drosanthemum aureopurpureum L.Bolus, endemic
- Drosanthemum austricola L.Bolus, endemic
- Drosanthemum autumnale L.Bolus, endemic
- Drosanthemum badpoortensis Van Jaarsv. endemic
- Drosanthemum barkerae L.Bolus, endemic
- Drosanthemum barwickii L.Bolus, accepted as Drosanthemum subcompressum (Haw.) Schwantes, present
- Drosanthemum bellum L.Bolus, endemic
- Drosanthemum bicolor L.Bolus, endemic
- Drosanthemum boerhavii (Eckl. & Zeyh.) H.E.K.Hartmann, endemic
- Drosanthemum breve L.Bolus, endemic
- Drosanthemum brevifolium (Aiton) Schwantes, indigenous
- Drosanthemum calycinum (Haw.) Schwantes, endemic
- Drosanthemum candens (Haw.) Schwantes, endemic
- Drosanthemum capillare (Thunb.) Schwantes, endemic
- Drosanthemum cereale L.Bolus, endemic
- Drosanthemum chrysum L.Bolus, endemic
- Drosanthemum collinum (Sond.) Schwantes, endemic
- Drosanthemum comptonii L.Bolus, endemic
- Drosanthemum concavum L.Bolus, endemic
- Drosanthemum crassum L.Bolus, endemic
- Drosanthemum croceum L.Bolus, accepted as Drosanthemum pulchrum L.Bolus, endemic
- Drosanthemum curtophyllum L.Bolus, indigenous
- Drosanthemum cymiferum L.Bolus, endemic
- Drosanthemum deciduum H.E.K.Hartmann & Bruckm. endemic
- Drosanthemum dejagerae L.Bolus, endemic
- Drosanthemum delicatulum (L.Bolus) Schwantes, endemic
- Drosanthemum dipageae H.E.K.Hartmann, endemic
- Drosanthemum diversifolium L.Bolus, endemic
- Drosanthemum duplessiae L.Bolus, endemic
- Drosanthemum eburneum L.Bolus, endemic
- Drosanthemum edwardsiae L.Bolus, endemic
- Drosanthemum erigeriflorum (Jacq.) Stearn, endemic
- Drosanthemum expersum (N.E.Br.) Schwantes, endemic
- Drosanthemum filiforme L.Bolus, endemic
- Drosanthemum flammeum L.Bolus, endemic
- Drosanthemum flavum (Haw.) Schwantes, endemic
- Drosanthemum floribundum (Haw.) Schwantes, endemic
- Drosanthemum fourcadei (L.Bolus) Schwantes, endemic
- Drosanthemum framesii L.Bolus, endemic
- Drosanthemum fulleri L.Bolus, endemic
- Drosanthemum giffenii (L.Bolus) Schwantes, endemic
  - Drosanthemum giffenii (L.Bolus) Schwantes var. intertextum (L.Bolus) Schwantes, accepted as Drosanthemum giffenii (L.Bolus) Schwantes, present
- Drosanthemum glabrescens L.Bolus, endemic
- Drosanthemum globosum L.Bolus, endemic
- Drosanthemum godmaniae L.Bolus, endemic
- Drosanthemum gracillimum L.Bolus, endemic
- Drosanthemum hallii L.Bolus, endemic
- Drosanthemum hirtellum (Haw.) Schwantes, endemic
- Drosanthemum hispidum (L.) Schwantes, indigenous
  - Drosanthemum hispidum (L.) Schwantes var. platypetalum (Haw.) Schwantes, accepted as Drosanthemum hispidum (L.) Schwantes, present
- Drosanthemum hispifolium (Haw.) Schwantes, endemic
- Drosanthemum inornatum (L.Bolus) L.Bolus, indigenous
- Drosanthemum insolitum L.Bolus, accepted as Drosanthemum boerhavii (Eckl. & Zeyh.) H.E.K.Hartmann, endemic
- Drosanthemum intermedium (L.Bolus) L.Bolus, endemic
- Drosanthemum jamesii L.Bolus, endemic
- Drosanthemum karrooense L.Bolus, endemic
- Drosanthemum latipetalum L.Bolus, endemic
- Drosanthemum lavisii L.Bolus, endemic
- Drosanthemum laxum L.Bolus, endemic
- Drosanthemum leipoldtii L.Bolus, endemic
- Drosanthemum leptum L.Bolus, endemic
- Drosanthemum lignosum L.Bolus, endemic
- Drosanthemum lique (N.E.Br.) Schwantes, endemic
- Drosanthemum littlewoodii L.Bolus, accepted as Drosanthemum albens L.Bolus
- Drosanthemum longipes (L.Bolus) H.E.K.Hartmann, endemic
- Drosanthemum luederitzii (Engl.) Schwantes, indigenous
- Drosanthemum macrocalyx L.Bolus, endemic
- Drosanthemum maculatum (Haw.) Schwantes, endemic
- Drosanthemum marinum L.Bolus, endemic
- Drosanthemum martinii L.Bolus, accepted as Dorotheanthus bellidiformis (Burm.f.) N.E.Br. subsp. bellidiformis, present
- Drosanthemum mathewsii L.Bolus, endemic
- Drosanthemum micans (L.) Schwantes, endemic
- Drosanthemum montaguense L.Bolus, accepted as Drosanthemum praecultum (N.E.Br.) Schwantes, present
- Drosanthemum muiri L.Bolus, endemic
- Drosanthemum nitidum (Haw.) Schwantes, accepted as Mesembryanthemum nitidum Haw. indigenous
- Drosanthemum oculatum L.Bolus, endemic
- Drosanthemum opacum L.Bolus, endemic
- Drosanthemum pallens (Haw.) Schwantes, endemic
- Drosanthemum papillatum L.Bolus, endemic
- Drosanthemum parvifolium (Haw.) Schwantes, endemic
- Drosanthemum paxianum (Schltr. & Diels) Schwantes, accepted as Drosanthemum luederitzii (Engl.) Schwantes, present
- Drosanthemum pickhardii L.Bolus, accepted as Drosanthemum speciosum (Haw.) Schwantes, endemic
- Drosanthemum praecultum (N.E.Br.) Schwantes, endemic
- Drosanthemum prostratum L.Bolus, endemic
- Drosanthemum pulchellum L.Bolus, endemic
- Drosanthemum pulchrum L.Bolus, endemic
- Drosanthemum pulverulentum (Haw.) Schwantes, endemic
- Drosanthemum quadratum Klak, endemic
- Drosanthemum ramosissimum (Schltr.) L.Bolus, endemic
- Drosanthemum roridum L.Bolus, accepted as Drosanthemum subcompressum (Haw.) Schwantes, present
- Drosanthemum roseatum (N.E.Br.) L.Bolus, accepted as Drosanthemum pulverulentum (Haw.) Schwantes, present
- Drosanthemum salicola L.Bolus, endemic
- Drosanthemum schoenlandianum (Schltr.) L.Bolus, endemic
- Drosanthemum semiglobosum L.Bolus, endemic
- Drosanthemum sessile (Thunb.) Schwantes, accepted as Ruschia sessilis (Thunb.) H.E.K.Hartmann
- Drosanthemum speciosum (Haw.) Schwantes, endemic
- Drosanthemum splendens L.Bolus, accepted as Drosanthemum speciosum (Haw.) Schwantes, endemic
- Drosanthemum stokoei L.Bolus, endemic
- Drosanthemum striatum (Haw.) Schwantes, endemic
- Drosanthemum striatum (Haw.) Schwantes var. hispifolium (Haw.) G.D.Rowley, accepted as Drosanthemum hispifolium (Haw.) Schwantes, present
- Drosanthemum striatum (Haw.) Schwantes var. pallens (Haw.) G.D.Rowley, accepted as Drosanthemum pallens (Haw.) Schwantes, present
- Drosanthemum strictifolium L.Bolus, accepted as Drosanthemum boerhavii (Eckl. & Zeyh.) H.E.K.Hartmann, endemic
- Drosanthemum subalbum L.Bolus, accepted as Drosanthemum diversifolium L.Bolus, present
- Drosanthemum subclausum L.Bolus, endemic
- Drosanthemum subcompressum (Haw.) Schwantes, endemic
- Drosanthemum subglobosum (Haw.) Schwantes, accepted as Drosanthemum capillare (Thunb.) Schwantes, present
- Drosanthemum subplanum L.Bolus, endemic
- Drosanthemum subspinosum (Kuntze) H.E.K.Hartmann, endemic
- Drosanthemum tardum L.Bolus, endemic
- Drosanthemum thudichumii L.Bolus, endemic
  - Drosanthemum thudichumii L.Bolus var. gracilius L.Bolus, accepted as Drosanthemum thudichumii L.Bolus, indigenous
  - Drosanthemum thudichumii L.Bolus var. gracilius L.Bolus forma aurantiac L.Bolus, accepted as Drosanthemum thudichumii L.Bolus, present
  - Drosanthemum thudichumii L.Bolus var. gracilius L.Bolus forma aurea, accepted as Drosanthemum thudichumii L.Bolus, present
- Drosanthemum torquatum (Haw.) Schwantes, accepted as Drosanthemum floribundum (Haw.) Schwantes, present
- Drosanthemum tuberculiferum L.Bolus, endemic
- Drosanthemum uniflorum (L.Bolus) Friedrich ex H.Jacobsen, accepted as Lampranthus uniflorus (L.Bolus) L.Bolus, present
- Drosanthemum vandermerwei L.Bolus, endemic
- Drosanthemum vespertinum L.Bolus, endemic
  - Drosanthemum vespertinum L.Bolus var. suffusum L.Bolus, accepted as Drosanthemum vespertinum L.Bolus, present
- Drosanthemum wittebergense L.Bolus, endemic
- Drosanthemum worcesterense L.Bolus, endemic
- Drosanthemum zygophylloides (L.Bolus) L.Bolus, endemic

== Eberlanzia ==
Genus Eberlanzia:

- Eberlanzia aculeata (N.E.Br.) Schwantes, accepted as Ruschia spinosa (L.) Dehn, present
- Eberlanzia albertensis (L.Bolus) L.Bolus, accepted as Ruschia spinosa (L.) Dehn, present
- Eberlanzia armata (L.Bolus) L.Bolus, accepted as Arenifera stylosa (L.Bolus) H.E.K.Hartmann, present
- Eberlanzia cradockensis (Kuntze) Schwantes, accepted as Ruschia cradockensis (Kuntze) H.E.K.Hartmann & Stuber subsp. cradockensis, present
- Eberlanzia cyathiformis (L.Bolus) H.E.K.Hartmann, indigenous
- Eberlanzia dichotoma (L.Bolus) H.E.K.Hartmann, endemic
- Eberlanzia disarticulata (L.Bolus) L.Bolus, accepted as Antimima hantamensis (Engl.) H.E.K.Hartmann & Stuber, present
- Eberlanzia divaricata (L.Bolus) L.Bolus, accepted as Ruschia divaricata L.Bolus, present
- Eberlanzia ebracteata (L.Bolus) H.E.K.Hartmann, indigenous
- Eberlanzia ferox (L.Bolus) L.Bolus, accepted as Ruschia intricata (N.E.Br.) H.E.K.Hartmann & Stuber, present
- Eberlanzia globularis (L.Bolus) L.Bolus, accepted as Ruschia spinosa (L.) Dehn, present
- Eberlanzia gravida (L.Bolus) H.E.K.Hartmann, endemic
- Eberlanzia horrescens (L.Bolus) L.Bolus, accepted as Ruschia cradockensis (Kuntze) H.E.K.Hartmann & Stuber subsp. cradockensis, present
  - Eberlanzia horrescens (L.Bolus) L.Bolus var. densa(L.Bolus) H.Jacobsen, accepted as Ruschia cradockensis (Kuntze) H.E.K.Hartmann & Stuber subsp. cradockensis, present
- Eberlanzia horrida (L.Bolus) L.Bolus, accepted as Ruschia cradockensis (Kuntze) H.E.K.Hartmann & Stuber subsp. cradockensis, present
- Eberlanzia hospitalis (Dinter) Schwantes, accepted as Ruschia spinosa (L.) Dehn, present
- Eberlanzia intricata (N.E.Br.) Schwantes, accepted as Ruschia intricata (N.E.Br.) H.E.K.Hartmann & Stuber, present
- Eberlanzia macroura (L.Bolus) L.Bolus, accepted as Ruschia spinosa (L.) Dehn, present
- Eberlanzia micrantha (Pax) Schwantes, accepted as Ruschia spinosa (L.) Dehn, present
- Eberlanzia mucronifera (Haw.) Schwantes, accepted as Ruschia spinosa (L.) Dehn, present
- Eberlanzia munita (L.Bolus) Schwantes, accepted as Ruschia intricata (N.E.Br.) H.E.K.Hartmann & Stuber, present
- Eberlanzia parvibracteata (L.Bolus) H.E.K.Hartmann, endemic
- Eberlanzia persistens (L.Bolus) L.Bolus, accepted as Ruschia intricata (N.E.Br.) H.E.K.Hartmann & Stuber, present
- Eberlanzia puniens (L.Bolus) L.Bolus, accepted as Ruschia intricata (N.E.Br.) H.E.K.Hartmann & Stuber, present
- Eberlanzia schneideriana (A.Berger) H.E.K.Hartmann, indigenous
- Eberlanzia sedoides (Dinter & A.Berger) Schwantes, indigenous
- Eberlanzia spinosa (L.) Schwantes, accepted as Ruschia spinosa (L.) Dehn, present
- Eberlanzia stylosa (L.Bolus) L.Bolus, accepted as Arenifera stylosa (L.Bolus) H.E.K.Hartmann, present
- Eberlanzia tatasbergensis L.Bolus, accepted as Ruschia divaricata L.Bolus, present
- Eberlanzia triticiformis (L.Bolus) L.Bolus, accepted as Ruschia cradockensis (Kuntze) H.E.K.Hartmann & Stuber subsp. triticiformis (L.Bolus) H.E.K.Hartmann, present
  - Eberlanzia triticiformis (L.Bolus) L.Bolus var. subglobosaL.Bolus, accepted as Ruschia cradockensis (Kuntze) H.E.K.Hartmann & Stuber subsp. triticiformis (L.Bolus) H.E.K.Hartmann, present
- Eberlanzia vanheerdei L.Bolus, accepted as Leipoldtia alborosea (L.Bolus) H.E.K.Hartmann & Stuber, present
- Eberlanzia vulnerans (L.Bolus) L.Bolus, accepted as Ruschia divaricata L.Bolus, present

== Ebracteola ==
Genus Ebracteola:

- Ebracteola candida L.Bolus, accepted as Ebracteola derenbergiana (Dinter) Dinter & Schwantes
- Ebracteola derenbergiana (Dinter) Dinter & Schwantes, indigenous
- Ebracteola fulleri (L.Bolus) Glen, indigenous
- Ebracteola wilmaniae (L.Bolus) Glen, endemic

== Ectotropis ==
Genus Ectotropis:

- Ectotropis alpina N.E.Br. accepted as Delosperma alpinum (N.E.Br.) S.A.Hammer & A.P.Dold, present

== Enarganthe ==
Genus Enarganthe:

- Enarganthe octonaria (L.Bolus) N.E.Br. endemic

== Erepsia ==
Genus Erepsia:

- Erepsia anceps (Haw.) Schwantes, endemic
- Erepsia aperta L.Bolus, endemic
- Erepsia aristata (L.Bolus) Liede & H.E.K.Hartmann, endemic
- Erepsia aspera (Haw.) L.Bolus, endemic
- Erepsia babiloniae Liede, endemic
- Erepsia bracteata (Aiton) Schwantes, endemic
- Erepsia brevipetala L.Bolus, endemic
- Erepsia caledonica L.Bolus, accepted as Erepsia hybrid, present
- Erepsia carterae L.Bolus, accepted as Erepsia gracilis (Haw.) L.Bolus, present
  - Erepsia carterae L.Bolus var. leptaL.Bolus, accepted as Erepsia gracilis (Haw.) L.Bolus, present
- Erepsia compressa (Haw.) Schwantes, accepted as Erepsia hybrid, present
- Erepsia distans L.Bolus, endemic
- Erepsia dubia Liede, endemic
- Erepsia dunensis (Sond.) Klak, endemic
- Erepsia esterhuyseniae L.Bolus, endemic
- Erepsia forficata (L.) Schwantes, endemic
- Erepsia gracilis (Haw.) L.Bolus, endemic
- Erepsia hallii L.Bolus, endemic
- Erepsia heteropetala (Haw.) Schwantes, endemic
- Erepsia inclaudens (Haw.) Schwantes, endemic
- Erepsia insignis (Schltr.) Schwantes, endemic
- Erepsia lacera (Haw.) Liede, endemic
- Erepsia laxa L.Bolus, accepted as Erepsia anceps (Haw.) Schwantes, present
- Erepsia levis L.Bolus, accepted as Erepsia gracilis (Haw.) L.Bolus, present
- Erepsia marlothii N.E.Br. accepted as Erepsia saturata L.Bolus, present
- Erepsia mutabilis (Haw.) Schwantes, accepted as Erepsia forficata (L.) Schwantes, present
- Erepsia nudicaulis (A.Berger) H.Jacobsen, accepted as Erepsia aspera (Haw.) L.Bolus, present
- Erepsia oxysepala (Schltr.) L.Bolus, endemic
- Erepsia pageae L.Bolus, accepted as Erepsia patula (Haw.) Schwantes, present
- Erepsia patula (Haw.) Schwantes, endemic
- Erepsia pentagona (L.Bolus) L.Bolus, endemic
- Erepsia pillansii (Kensit) Liede, endemic
- Erepsia polita (L.Bolus) L.Bolus, endemic
- Erepsia polypetala (A.Berger & Schltr.) L.Bolus, endemic
- Erepsia promontorii L.Bolus, endemic
- Erepsia racemosa (N.E.Br.) Schwantes, accepted as Erepsia bracteata (Aiton) Schwantes, present
- Erepsia radiata (Haw.) Schwantes, accepted as Erepsia bracteata (Aiton) Schwantes, present
- Erepsia ramosa L.Bolus, endemic
- Erepsia roseo-alba L.Bolus, accepted as Erepsia ramosa L.Bolus, present
- Erepsia saturata L.Bolus, endemic
- Erepsia serrata (L.) L.Bolus, accepted as Circandra serrata (L.) N.E.Br. present
- Erepsia simulans (L.Bolus) Klak, endemic
- Erepsia steytlerae L.Bolus, endemic
- Erepsia tenuicaulis (A.Berger) H.Jacobsen, accepted as Erepsia gracilis (Haw.) L.Bolus, present
- Erepsia tuberculata N.E.Br. accepted as Erepsia aspera (Haw.) L.Bolus, present
- Erepsia urbaniana (Schltr.) Schwantes, accepted as Lampranthus emarginatus (L.) N.E.Br. endemic
- Erepsia villiersii L.Bolus, endemic

== Esterhuysenia ==
Genus Esterhuysenia:

- Esterhuysenia alpina L.Bolus, endemic
- Esterhuysenia drepanophylla (Schltr. & A.Berger) H.E.K.Hartmann, endemic
- Esterhuysenia grahambeckii Van Jaarsv. accepted as Roosia grahambeckii (Van Jaarsv.) Van Jaarsv. endemic
- Esterhuysenia inclaudens (L.Bolus) H.E.K.Hartmann, endemic
- Esterhuysenia lucilleae Van Jaarsv. accepted as Roosia lucilleae (Van Jaarsv.) Van Jaarsv. endemic
- Esterhuysenia mucronata (L.Bolus) Klak, endemic
- Esterhuysenia stokoei (L.Bolus) H.E.K.Hartmann, endemic

== Eurystigma ==
Genus Eurystigma:

- Eurystigma clavatum (L.Bolus) L.Bolus, accepted as Mesembryanthemum eurystigmatum Gerbaulet, present

== Faucaria ==
Genus Faucaria:

- Faucaria acutipetala L.Bolus, accepted as Faucaria felina (L.) Schwantes, present
- Faucaria albidens N.E.Br. accepted as Faucaria bosscheana (A.Berger) Schwantes, present
- Faucaria bosscheana (A.Berger) Schwantes, endemic
  - Faucaria bosscheana (A.Berger) Schwantes var. haagei(Tischer) H.Jacobsen, accepted as Faucaria bosscheana (A.Berger) Schwantes, present
- Faucaria britteniae L.Bolus, endemic
- Faucaria candida L.Bolus, accepted as Faucaria felina (L.) Schwantes, present
- Faucaria coronata L.Bolus, accepted as Faucaria britteniae L.Bolus, present
- Faucaria cradockensis L.Bolus, accepted as Faucaria felina (L.) Schwantes, present
- Faucaria crassisepala L.Bolus, accepted as Faucaria felina (L.) Schwantes, present
- Faucaria duncanii L.Bolus, accepted as Faucaria felina (L.) Schwantes, present
- Faucaria felina (L.) Schwantes, endemic
  - Faucaria felina (L.) Schwantes subsp. tuberculosa (Rolfe) L.E.Groen, accepted as Faucaria tuberculosa (Rolfe) Schwantes, present
  - Faucaria felina (L.) Schwantes var. jamesiiL.Bolus, accepted as Faucaria felina (L.) Schwantes, present
  - Faucaria felina (Weston) Schwantes subsp. britteniae (L.Bolus) L.E.Groen, accepted as Faucaria britteniae L.Bolus, present
- Faucaria grandis L.Bolus, accepted as Faucaria britteniae L.Bolus, present
- Faucaria gratiae L.Bolus, endemic
- Faucaria hooleae L.Bolus, accepted as Faucaria gratiae L.Bolus, present
- Faucaria kingiae L.Bolus, accepted as Faucaria felina (L.) Schwantes, present
- Faucaria latipetala L.Bolus, accepted as Faucaria felina (L.) Schwantes, present
- Faucaria laxipetala L.Bolus, accepted as Faucaria felina (L.) Schwantes, present
- Faucaria longidens L.Bolus, accepted as Faucaria felina (L.) Schwantes, present
- Faucaria longifolia L.Bolus, accepted as Faucaria felina (L.) Schwantes, present
- Faucaria lupina (Haw.) Schwantes, accepted as Faucaria felina (L.) Schwantes, present
- Faucaria militaris Tischer, accepted as Faucaria felina (L.) Schwantes, present
- Faucaria montana L.Bolus, accepted as Faucaria felina (L.) Schwantes, present
- Faucaria multidens L.Bolus, accepted as Faucaria felina (L.) Schwantes, present
  - Faucaria multidens L.Bolus var. paardeportensisL.Bolus, accepted as Faucaria felina (L.) Schwantes, present
- Faucaria nemorosa L.Bolus ex L.E.Groen, endemic
- Faucaria paucidens N.E.Br. accepted as Faucaria bosscheana (A.Berger) Schwantes, present
- Faucaria peersii L.Bolus, accepted as Faucaria bosscheana (A.Berger) Schwantes, present
- Faucaria plana L.Bolus, accepted as Faucaria felina (L.) Schwantes, present
- Faucaria ryneveldiae L.Bolus, accepted as Faucaria felina (L.) Schwantes, present
- Faucaria smithii L.Bolus, accepted as Faucaria britteniae L.Bolus, present
- Faucaria speciosa L.Bolus, accepted as Faucaria britteniae L.Bolus, present
- Faucaria subindurata L.Bolus, accepted as Faucaria subintegra L.Bolus, present
- Faucaria subintegra L.Bolus, endemic
- Faucaria tigrina (Haw.) Schwantes, endemic
- Faucaria tigrina (Haw.) Schwantes forma splendens H.Jacobsen & G.D.Rowley, accepted as Faucaria tigrina (Haw.) Schwantes, present
- Faucaria tuberculosa (Rolfe) Schwantes, endemic
- Faucaria uniondalensis L.Bolus, accepted as Faucaria felina (L.) Schwantes, present

== Fenestraria ==
Genus Fenestraria:

- Fenestraria rhopalophylla (Schltr. & Diels) N.E.Br. indigenous
  - Fenestraria rhopalophylla (Schltr. & Diels) N.E.Br. subsp. aurantiaca (N.E.Br.) H.E.K.Hartmann, indigenous

== Frithia ==
Genus Frithia:

- Frithia humilis Burgoyne, endemic
- Frithia pulchra N.E.Br. endemic
  - Frithia pulchra N.E.Br. var. minorde Boer, accepted as Frithia humilis Burgoyne, present

== Galenia ==
Genus Galenia:

- Galenia acutifolia Adamson, endemic
- Galenia affinis Sond. endemic
- Galenia africana L. indigenous
  - Galenia africana L. var. pentandra Hiern, accepted as Galenia africana L. present
  - Galenia africana L. var. secundata Adamson, accepted as Galenia africana L. present
- Galenia collina (Eckl. & Zeyh.) Walp. endemic
- Galenia crystallina (Eckl. & Zeyh.) Fenzl, indigenous
  - Galenia crystallina (Eckl. & Zeyh.) Fenzl var. crystallina, endemic
  - Galenia crystallina (Eckl. & Zeyh.) Fenzl var. maritima Adamson, endemic
- Galenia cymosa Adamson, endemic
- Galenia dregeana Fenzl ex Sond. indigenous
- Galenia ecklonis Walp. endemic
- Galenia exigua Adamson, endemic
- Galenia fallax Pax, accepted as Galenia fruticosa (L.f.) Sond.
- Galenia filiformis (Thunb.) N.E.Br. endemic
- Galenia fruticosa (L.f.) Sond. indigenous
  - Galenia fruticosa (L.f.) Sond. var. prostrata Adamson, accepted as Galenia fruticosa (L.f.) Sond. present
- Galenia glandulifera Bittrich, endemic
- Galenia hemisphaerica Adamson, indigenous
- Galenia herniariaefolia (C.Presl) Fenzl, endemic
- Galenia hispidissima Fenzl, endemic
- Galenia meziana K.Mull. indigenous
- Galenia namaensis Schinz, indigenous
- Galenia pallens (Eckl. & Zeyh.) Walp. endemic
- Galenia papulosa (Eckl. & Zeyh.) Sond. indigenous
- Galenia portulacacea Fenzl, endemic
- Galenia procumbens L.f. endemic
- Galenia prostrata G.Schellenb. endemic
- Galenia pruinosa Sond. indigenous
- Galenia pubescens (Eckl. & Zeyh.) Druce, endemic
  - Galenia pubescens (Eckl. & Zeyh.) Druce var. cerosa Adamson, accepted as Galenia pubescens (Eckl. & Zeyh.) Druce, present
  - Galenia pubescens (Eckl. & Zeyh.) Druce var. fourcadei Adamson, accepted as Galenia pubescens (Eckl. & Zeyh.) Druce, present
  - Galenia pubescens (Eckl. & Zeyh.) Druce var. lignosa Adamson, accepted as Galenia pubescens (Eckl. & Zeyh.) Druce, present
  - Galenia pubescens (Eckl. & Zeyh.) Druce var. pallens Adamson, accepted as Galenia pallens (Eckl. & Zeyh.) Walp. present
- Galenia rigida Adamson, endemic
- Galenia sarcophylla Fenzl, indigenous
- Galenia secunda (L.f.) Sond. indigenous
- Galenia squamulosa (Eckl. & Zeyh.) Fenzl, indigenous
- Galenia subcarnosa Adamson, endemic

== Gasoul ==
Genus Gasoul:

- Gasoul aitonis (Jacq.) H.Eichler, accepted as Mesembryanthemum aitonis Jacq. indigenous
- Gasoul crystallinum (L.) Rothm. accepted as Mesembryanthemum crystallinum L. indigenous
- Gasoul nodiflorum (L.) Rothm. accepted as Mesembryanthemum nodiflorum L. indigenous

== Gibbaeum ==
Genus Gibbaeum:

- Gibbaeum album N.E.Br. endemic
  - Gibbaeum album N.E.Br. forma roseum (N.E.Br.) G.D.Rowley, accepted as Gibbaeum album N.E.Br. present
- Gibbaeum angulipes (L.Bolus) N.E.Br. endemic
- Gibbaeum austricola Glen, accepted as Gibbaeum hartmannianum Thiede & Niesler, indigenous
- Gibbaeum blackburniae L.Bolus, accepted as Gibbaeum heathii (N.E.Br.) L.Bolus, present
- Gibbaeum comptonii (L.Bolus) L.Bolus, accepted as Gibbaeum heathii (N.E.Br.) L.Bolus, present
- Gibbaeum cryptopodium (Kensit) L.Bolus, accepted as Gibbaeum nuciforme (Haw.) Glen & H.E.K.Hartmann, present
- Gibbaeum dispar N.E.Br. endemic
- Gibbaeum esterhuyseniae L.Bolus, endemic
- Gibbaeum geminum N.E.Br. endemic
- Gibbaeum gibbosum (Haw.) N.E.Br. endemic
- Gibbaeum haagei Schwantes, accepted as Gibbaeum velutinum (L.Bolus) Schwantes, indigenous
  - Gibbaeum haagei Schwantes ex H.Jacobsen, accepted as Gibbaeum petrense (N.E.Br.) Tischer, indigenous
  - Gibbaeum haagei Schwantes var. parviflorum L.Bolus, accepted as Gibbaeum hartmannianum Thiede & Niesler, indigenous
- Gibbaeum haaglenii H.E.K.Hartmann, accepted as Gibbaeum velutinum (L.Bolus) Schwantes, endemic
- Gibbaeum hartmannianum Thiede & Niesler, endemic
- Gibbaeum heathii (N.E.Br.) L.Bolus, endemic
  - Gibbaeum heathii (N.E.Br.) L.Bolus var. elevatum(L.Bolus) L.Bolus, accepted as Gibbaeum heathii (N.E.Br.) L.Bolus, present
  - Gibbaeum heathii (N.E.Br.) L.Bolus var. majus(L.Bolus) L.Bolus, accepted as Gibbaeum heathii (N.E.Br.) L.Bolus, present
- Gibbaeum hortenseae (N.E.Br.) Thiede & Klak, endemic
- Gibbaeum johnstonii Van Jaarsv. & S.A.Hammer, accepted as Gibbaeum nebrownii Tischer, present
- Gibbaeum luckhoffii (L.Bolus) L.Bolus, accepted as Gibbaeum heathii (N.E.Br.) L.Bolus, present
- Gibbaeum luteoviride (Haw.) N.E.Br. accepted as Gibbaeum gibbosum (Haw.) N.E.Br. present
- Gibbaeum muirii N.E.Br. accepted as Gibbaeum gibbosum (Haw.) N.E.Br. endemic
- Gibbaeum nebrownii Tischer, endemic
- Gibbaeum nuciforme (Haw.) Glen & H.E.K.Hartmann, endemic
- Gibbaeum pachypodium (Kensit) L.Bolus, endemic
- Gibbaeum petrense (N.E.Br.) Tischer, endemic
- Gibbaeum pilosulum (N.E.Br.) N.E.Br. endemic
- Gibbaeum pubescens (Haw.) N.E.Br. endemic
  - Gibbaeum pubescens (Haw.) N.E.Br. subsp. shandii (N.E.Br.) Glen, accepted as Gibbaeum shandii N.E.Br. present
- Gibbaeum schwantesii Tischer, endemic
- Gibbaeum shandii N.E.Br. endemic
- Gibbaeum tischleri H.Wulff, accepted as Gibbaeum petrense (N.E.Br.) Tischer, indigenous
- Gibbaeum velutinum (L.Bolus) Schwantes, endemic

== Glottiphyllum ==
Genus Glottiphyllum:

- Glottiphyllum angustum (Haw.) N.E.Br. accepted as Glottiphyllum cruciatum (Haw.) N.E.Br. present
- Glottiphyllum apiculatum N.E.Br. accepted as Glottiphyllum cruciatum (Haw.) N.E.Br. present
- Glottiphyllum armoedense Schwantes, accepted as Glottiphyllum cruciatum (Haw.) N.E.Br. present
- Glottiphyllum arrectum N.E.Br. accepted as Glottiphyllum surrectum (Haw.) L.Bolus, present
- Glottiphyllum barrydalense Schwantes, accepted as Glottiphyllum depressum (Haw.) N.E.Br. present
- Glottiphyllum buffelsvleyense Schwantes, accepted as Glottiphyllum depressum (Haw.) N.E.Br. present
- Glottiphyllum carnosum N.E.Br. endemic
- Glottiphyllum cilliersiae Schwantes, accepted as Glottiphyllum linguiforme (L.) N.E.Br. present
- Glottiphyllum compressum L.Bolus, accepted as Glottiphyllum regium N.E.Br. present
- Glottiphyllum concavum N.E.Br. accepted as Glottiphyllum surrectum (Haw.) L.Bolus, present
- Glottiphyllum cruciatum (Haw.) N.E.Br. endemic
- Glottiphyllum davisii L.Bolus, accepted as Glottiphyllum longum (Haw.) N.E.Br. present
- Glottiphyllum depressum (Haw.) N.E.Br. endemic
- Glottiphyllum difforme (L.) N.E.Br. endemic
- Glottiphyllum erectum N.E.Br. accepted as Glottiphyllum longum (Haw.) N.E.Br. present
- Glottiphyllum fergusoniae L.Bolus, endemic
- Glottiphyllum fragrans (Salm-Dyck) Schwantes, accepted as Glottiphyllum depressum (Haw.) N.E.Br. present
- Glottiphyllum framesii L.Bolus, accepted as Glottiphyllum depressum (Haw.) N.E.Br. present
- Glottiphyllum grandiflorum (Haw.) N.E.Br. endemic
- Glottiphyllum haagei Tischer, accepted as Glottiphyllum depressum (Haw.) N.E.Br. present
- Glottiphyllum herrei L.Bolus, accepted as Glottiphyllum suave N.E.Br. present
- Glottiphyllum jacobsenianum Schwantes, accepted as Glottiphyllum depressum (Haw.) N.E.Br. present
- Glottiphyllum jordaanianum Schwantes, accepted as Glottiphyllum carnosum N.E.Br. present
- Glottiphyllum latifolium N.E.Br. accepted as Glottiphyllum linguiforme (L.) N.E.Br. present
- Glottiphyllum latum N.E.Br. accepted as Glottiphyllum longum (Haw.) N.E.Br. present
  - Glottiphyllum latum N.E.Br. var. cultratum(Salm-Dyck) N.E.Br. accepted as Glottiphyllum longum (Haw.) N.E.Br. present
- Glottiphyllum linguiforme (L.) N.E.Br. endemic
- Glottiphyllum longipes N.E.Br. accepted as Glottiphyllum cruciatum (Haw.) N.E.Br. present
- Glottiphyllum longum (Haw.) N.E.Br. endemic
  - Glottiphyllum longum (Haw.) N.E.Br. var. heterophyllum(Haw.) G.D.Rowley, accepted as Glottiphyllum longum (Haw.) N.E.Br. present
- Glottiphyllum marlothii Schwantes, accepted as Glottiphyllum depressum (Haw.) N.E.Br. present
- Glottiphyllum muirii N.E.Br. accepted as Glottiphyllum depressum (Haw.) N.E.Br. present
- Glottiphyllum neilii N.E.Br. endemic
- Glottiphyllum nelii Schwantes, endemic
- Glottiphyllum nysiae Schwantes, accepted as Glottiphyllum depressum (Haw.) N.E.Br. present
- Glottiphyllum ochraceum (A.Berger) N.E.Br. accepted as Malephora ochracea (A.Berger) H.E.K.Hartmann, present
- Glottiphyllum oligocarpum L.Bolus, endemic
- Glottiphyllum pallens L.Bolus, accepted as Glottiphyllum nelii Schwantes, present
- Glottiphyllum parvifolium L.Bolus, accepted as Glottiphyllum surrectum (Haw.) L.Bolus, present
- Glottiphyllum peersii L.Bolus, endemic
- Glottiphyllum platycarpum L.Bolus, accepted as Glottiphyllum depressum (Haw.) N.E.Br. present
- Glottiphyllum praepingue (Haw.) N.E.Br. accepted as Glottiphyllum cruciatum (Haw.) N.E.Br. present
- Glottiphyllum proclive N.E.Br. accepted as Glottiphyllum depressum (Haw.) N.E.Br. present
- Glottiphyllum propinquum N.E.Br. accepted as Glottiphyllum longum (Haw.) N.E.Br. present
- Glottiphyllum pygmaeum L.Bolus, accepted as Glottiphyllum nelii Schwantes, present
- Glottiphyllum regium N.E.Br. endemic
- Glottiphyllum rosaliae L.Bolus, accepted as Glottiphyllum cruciatum (Haw.) N.E.Br. present
- Glottiphyllum rubrostigma L.Bolus, accepted as Glottiphyllum surrectum (Haw.) L.Bolus, present
- Glottiphyllum rufescens (Haw.) Tischer, accepted as Glottiphyllum depressum (Haw.) N.E.Br. present
- Glottiphyllum ryderae Schwantes, accepted as Glottiphyllum linguiforme (L.) N.E.Br. present
- Glottiphyllum salmii (Haw.) N.E.Br. endemic
- Glottiphyllum semicylindricum (Haw.) N.E.Br. accepted as Glottiphyllum difforme (L.) N.E.Br. present
- Glottiphyllum starkeae L.Bolus, accepted as Glottiphyllum depressum (Haw.) N.E.Br. present
- Glottiphyllum suave N.E.Br. endemic
- Glottiphyllum subditum N.E.Br. accepted as Glottiphyllum difforme (L.) N.E.Br. present
- Glottiphyllum surrectum (Haw.) L.Bolus, endemic
- Glottiphyllum taurinum (Haw.) N.E.Br. accepted as Glottiphyllum depressum (Haw.) N.E.Br. present
- Glottiphyllum uncatum (Salm-Dyck) N.E.Br. accepted as Glottiphyllum longum (Haw.) N.E.Br. present
- Glottiphyllum uniondalense L.Bolus, accepted as Glottiphyllum depressum (Haw.) N.E.Br. present

== Halenbergia ==
Genus Halenbergia:

- Halenbergia hypertrophica (Dinter) Dinter, accepted as Mesembryanthemum hypertrophicum Dinter, indigenous
- Hallianthus griseus S.A.Hammer & U.Schmiedel, accepted as Cephalophyllum griseum (S.A.Hammer & U.Schmiedel) H.E.K.Hartmann, present
- Hallianthus planus (L.Bolus) H.E.K.Hartmann, endemic

== Hammeria ==
Genus Hammeria:

- Hammeria cedarbergensis Klak, endemic
- Hammeria gracilis Burgoyne, endemic
- Hammeria meleagris (L.Bolus) Klak, endemic
- Hammeria salteri (L.Bolus) Burgoyne, accepted as Hammeria meleagris (L.Bolus) Klak, present

== Hartmanthus ==
Genus Hartmanthus:

- Hartmanthus pergamentaceus (L.Bolus) S.A.Hammer, indigenous

== Hereroa ==
Genus Hereroa:

- Hereroa acuminata L.Bolus, endemic
- Hereroa albanensis L.Bolus, accepted as Rhombophyllum albanense (L.Bolus) H.E.K.Hartmann, present
- Hereroa aspera L.Bolus, endemic
- Hereroa brevifolia L.Bolus, endemic
- Hereroa calycina L.Bolus, endemic
- Hereroa carinans (Haw.) Dinter & Schwantes ex H.Jacobsen, endemic
- Hereroa concava L.Bolus, endemic
- Hereroa crassa L.Bolus, endemic
- Hereroa dyeri L.Bolus, accepted as Rhombophyllum dyeri (L.Bolus) H.E.K.Hartmann, present
- Hereroa fimbriata L.Bolus, endemic
- Hereroa glenensis (N.E.Br.) L.Bolus, endemic
- Hereroa gracilis L.Bolus, endemic
  - Hereroa gracilis L.Bolus var. compressa L.Bolus, accepted as Hereroa gracilis L.Bolus, present
- Hereroa granulata (N.E.Br.) Dinter & Schwantes, endemic
- Hereroa herrei Schwantes, endemic
- Hereroa hesperantha (Dinter & A.Berger) Dinter & Schwantes, indigenous
- Hereroa incurva L.Bolus, endemic
- Hereroa joubertii L.Bolus, endemic
- Hereroa latipetala L.Bolus, endemic
- Hereroa muirii L.Bolus, endemic
- Hereroa nelii Schwantes, endemic
- Hereroa odorata (L.Bolus) L.Bolus, endemic
- Hereroa pallens L.Bolus, endemic
- Hereroa rehneltiana (A.Berger) Dinter & Schwantes, endemic
- Hereroa stanfordiae L.Bolus, endemic
- Hereroa stanleyi (L.Bolus) L.Bolus, accepted as Chasmatophyllum stanleyi (L.Bolus) H.E.K.Hartmann, present
- Hereroa stenophylla L.Bolus, endemic
- Hereroa tenuifolia L.Bolus, endemic
- Hereroa teretifolia L.Bolus, endemic
- Hereroa tugwelliae (L.Bolus) L.Bolus, accepted as Bijlia tugwelliae (L.Bolus) S.A.Hammer, present
- Hereroa uncipetala (N.E.Br.) L.Bolus, accepted as Hereroa wilmaniae L.Bolus, present
- Hereroa willowmorensis L.Bolus, endemic
- Hereroa wilmaniae L.Bolus, endemic
  - Hereroa wilmaniae L.Bolus var. langebergensis L.Bolus, accepted as Hereroa wilmaniae L.Bolus, present

== Herrea ==
Genus Herrea:

- Herrea macrocalyx L.Bolus, accepted as Conicosia elongata (Haw.) N.E.Br. present
- Herrea nelii Schwantes, accepted as Conicosia elongata (Haw.) N.E.Br. present

== Herreanthus ==
Genus Herreanthus:

- Herreanthus meyeri Schwantes, accepted as Conophytum herreanthus S.A.Hammer subsp. herreanthus, present

== Hydrodea ==
Genus Hydrodea:

- Hydrodea cryptantha (Hook.f.) N.E.Br. accepted as Mesembryanthemum cryptanthum Hook.f. indigenous

== Hymenogyne ==
Genus Hymenogyne:

- Hymenogyne conica L.Bolus, endemic
- Hymenogyne glabra (Aiton) Haw. endemic

== Ihlenfeldtia ==
Genus Ihlenfeldtia:

- Ihlenfeldtia excavata (L.Bolus) H.E.K.Hartmann, endemic
- Ihlenfeldtia vanzylii (L.Bolus) H.E.K.Hartmann, endemic

== Imitaria ==
Genus Imitaria:

- Imitaria muirii N.E.Br. accepted as Gibbaeum nebrownii Tischer, present

== Jacobsenia ==
Genus Jacobsenia:

- Jacobsenia hallii L.Bolus, endemic
- Jacobsenia kolbei (L.Bolus) L.Bolus & Schwantes, endemic
- Jacobsenia vaginata (L.Bolus) Ihlenf. endemic

== Jensenobotrya ==
Genus Jensenobotrya:

- Jensenobotrya vanheerdei L.Bolus, accepted as Stoeberia carpii Friedrich, present

== Jordaaniella ==
Genus Jordaaniella:

- Jordaaniella anemoniflora (L.Bolus) Van Jaarsv. endemic
- Jordaaniella clavifolia (L.Bolus) H.E.K.Hartmann, endemic
- Jordaaniella cuprea (L.Bolus) H.E.K.Hartmann, indigenous
- Jordaaniella dubia (Haw.) H.E.K.Hartmann, endemic
- Jordaaniella maritima (L.Bolus) Van Jaarsv. endemic
- Jordaaniella spongiosa (L.Bolus) H.E.K.Hartmann, endemic
- Jordaaniella uniflora (L.Bolus) H.E.K.Hartmann, endemic

== Juttadinteria ==
Genus Juttadinteria:

- Juttadinteria albata (L.Bolus) L.Bolus, indigenous
- Juttadinteria attenuata Walgate, indigenous
- Juttadinteria decumbens Schick & Tischer, accepted as Juttadinteria deserticola (Marloth) Schwantes, present
- Juttadinteria deserticola (Marloth) Schwantes, indigenous
- Juttadinteria elizae (Dinter & A.Berger) L.Bolus, accepted as Juttadinteria deserticola (Marloth) Schwantes
- Juttadinteria insolita (L.Bolus) L.Bolus, accepted as Juttadinteria deserticola (Marloth) Schwantes, present
- Juttadinteria kovisimontana (Dinter) Schwantes, accepted as Juttadinteria simpsonii (Dinter) Schwantes
- Juttadinteria longipetala L.Bolus, accepted as Namibia cinerea (Marloth) Dinter & Schwantes
- Juttadinteria sauvissima (Dinter) Schwantes, accepted as Juttadinteria ausensis (L.Bolus) Schwantes
- Juttadinteria tetrasepala L.Bolus, accepted as Juttadinteria deserticola (Marloth) Schwantes, present

== Kensitia ==
Genus Kensitia:

- Kensitia pillansii (Kensit) Fedde, accepted as Erepsia pillansii (Kensit) Liede, present

== Khadia ==
Genus Khadia:

- Khadia acutipetala (N.E.Br.) N.E.Br. endemic
- Khadia alticola Chess. & H.E.K.Hartmann, endemic
- Khadia beswickii (L.Bolus) N.E.Br. endemic
- Khadia borealis L.Bolus, endemic
- Khadia carolinensis (L.Bolus) L.Bolus, endemic
- Khadia media P.J.D.Winter & N.Hahn, endemic
- Khadia nationae (N.E.Br.) N.E.Br. accepted as Khadia acutipetala (N.E.Br.) N.E.Br. present
- Khadia nelsoniae N.E.Br. accepted as Khadia beswickii (L.Bolus) N.E.Br. present

== Lampranthus ==
Genus Lampranthus:

- Lampranthus acrosepalus (L.Bolus) L.Bolus, endemic
- Lampranthus acutifolius (L.Bolus) N.E.Br. endemic
- Lampranthus aduncus (Haw.) N.E.Br. endemic
- Lampranthus aestivus (L.Bolus) L.Bolus, endemic
- Lampranthus affinis L.Bolus, endemic
- Lampranthus algoensis L.Bolus, endemic
- Lampranthus alpinus (L.Bolus) G.D.Rowley, accepted as Esterhuysenia alpina L.Bolus, present
- Lampranthus altistylus N.E.Br. endemic
- Lampranthus amabilis L.Bolus, endemic
- Lampranthus amoenus (Salm-Dyck ex DC.) N.E.Br. endemic
- Lampranthus amphibolius (G.D.Rowley) H.E.K.Hartmann, accepted as Phiambolia hallii (L.Bolus) Klak, present
- Lampranthus antemeridianus (L.Bolus) L.Bolus, endemic
- Lampranthus antonii L.Bolus, endemic
- Lampranthus arbuthnotiae (L.Bolus) L.Bolus, endemic
- Lampranthus arenarius H.E.K.Hartmann, accepted as Ruschiella lunulata (A.Berger) Klak, endemic
- Lampranthus arenicola L.Bolus, accepted as Phiambolia persistens (L.Bolus) Klak, present
- Lampranthus arenosus (L.Bolus) L.Bolus, accepted as Lampranthus lavisii (L.Bolus) L.Bolus, endemic
- Lampranthus argenteus (L.Bolus) L.Bolus, accepted as Ruschiella argentea (L.Bolus) Klak, endemic
- Lampranthus argillosus L.Bolus, endemic
- Lampranthus aurantiacus (DC.) Schwantes, accepted as Lampranthus glaucoides (Haw.) N.E.Br. present
- Lampranthus aureus (L.) N.E.Br. endemic
- Lampranthus austricola (L.Bolus) L.Bolus, endemic
- Lampranthus baylissii L.Bolus, accepted as Lampranthus fergusoniae (L.Bolus) L.Bolus, endemic
- Lampranthus berghiae (L.Bolus) L.Bolus, endemic
- Lampranthus bicolor (L.) N.E.Br., endemic
  - Lampranthus bicolor (L.) N.E.Br. var. inaequale(Haw.) Schwantes, accepted as Lampranthus inaequalis (Haw.) N.E.Br. present
- Lampranthus blandus (Haw.) Schwantes, accepted as Lampranthus multiradiatus (Jacq.) N.E.Br. endemic
- Lampranthus borealis L.Bolus, indigenous
- Lampranthus brachyandrus (L.Bolus) N.E.Br. indigenous
- Lampranthus brevistaminus (L.Bolus) L.Bolus, endemic
- Lampranthus brownii (Hook.f.) N.E.Br. endemic
- Lampranthus caespitosus (L.Bolus) N.E.Br. endemic
  - Lampranthus caespitosus (L.Bolus) N.E.Br. var. luxurians(L.Bolus) H.Jacobsen, accepted as Lampranthus debilis (Haw.) N.E.Br. present
- Lampranthus calcaratus (Wolley-Dod) N.E.Br. endemic
- Lampranthus candidus L.Bolus, accepted as Lampranthus falcatus (L.) N.E.Br. endemic
- Lampranthus capillaceus (L.Bolus) N.E.Br. accepted as Lampranthus falcatus (L.) N.E.Br. endemic
- Lampranthus caudatus L.Bolus, endemic
- Lampranthus cedarbergensis (L.Bolus) L.Bolus, accepted as Oscularia cedarbergensis (L.Bolus) H.E.K.Hartmann, present
- Lampranthus ceriseus (L.Bolus) L.Bolus, endemic
- Lampranthus citrinus (L.Bolus) L.Bolus, accepted as Lampranthus glaucus (L.) N.E.Br. endemic
- Lampranthus coccineus (Haw.) N.E.Br. endemic
- Lampranthus compressus L.Bolus, accepted as Oscularia compressa (L.Bolus) H.E.K.Hartmann, present
- Lampranthus comptonii (L.Bolus) N.E.Br. var. angustifolius(L.Bolus) L.Bolus, accepted as Oscularia comptonii (L.Bolus) H.E.K.Hartmann, present
  - Lampranthus comptonii (L.Bolus) N.E.Br. var. angustifolius forma roseus, accepted as Oscularia comptonii (L.Bolus) H.E.K.Hartmann, present
  - Lampranthus comptonii (L.Bolus) N.E.Br. var. comptonii, accepted as Oscularia comptonii (L.Bolus) H.E.K.Hartmann, present
- Lampranthus conspicuus (Haw.) N.E.Br. endemic
- Lampranthus convexus (L.Bolus) L.Bolus, accepted as Ruschiella lunulata (A.Berger) Klak, endemic
- Lampranthus copiosus (L.Bolus) L.Bolus, accepted as Oscularia copiosa (L.Bolus) H.E.K.Hartmann, present
- Lampranthus coralliflorus (Salm-Dyck) Schwantes, endemic
- Lampranthus creber L.Bolus, endemic
- Lampranthus curviflorus (Haw.) H.E.K.Hartmann, endemic
- Lampranthus curviflorus (Haw.) N.E.Br. ex H.Jacobsen, accepted as Lampranthus curviflorus (Haw.) H.E.K.Hartmann, present
- Lampranthus curvifolius (Haw.) N.E.Br., endemic
  - Lampranthus curvifolius (Haw.) N.E.Br. var. minor(Salm-Dyck) G.D.Rowley, accepted as Lampranthus flexifolius (Haw.) N.E.Br. present
- Lampranthus cyathiformis (L.Bolus) N.E.Br. endemic
- Lampranthus debilis (Haw.) N.E.Br. endemic
- Lampranthus deflexus (Aiton) N.E.Br. endemic
- Lampranthus deltoides (L.) Glen, accepted as Oscularia deltoides (L.) Schwantes, present
- Lampranthus densifolius (L.Bolus) L.Bolus, endemic
- Lampranthus densipetalus (L.Bolus) L.Bolus, endemic
- Lampranthus dependens (L.Bolus) L.Bolus, endemic
- Lampranthus diffusus (L.Bolus) N.E.Br. endemic
- Lampranthus dilutus N.E.Br. endemic
- Lampranthus disgregus (N.E.Br.) N.E.Br. endemic
- Lampranthus dissimilis (G.D.Rowley) H.E.K.Hartmann, accepted as Phiambolia littlewoodii (L.Bolus) Klak, present
- Lampranthus diutinus (L.Bolus) N.E.Br. endemic
- Lampranthus dregeanus (Sond.) N.E.Br. endemic
- Lampranthus dubitans (L.Bolus) L.Bolus, accepted as Phiambolia unca (L.Bolus) Klak, endemic
- Lampranthus dulcis (L.Bolus) L.Bolus, endemic
- Lampranthus dunensis (Sond.) L.Bolus, accepted as Erepsia dunensis (Sond.) Klak, present
- Lampranthus dyckii (A.Berger) N.E.Br. endemic
- Lampranthus ebracteatus L.Bolus, accepted as Oscularia comptonii (L.Bolus) H.E.K.Hartmann, endemic
- Lampranthus edwardsiae (L.Bolus) L.Bolus, accepted as Ruschiella lunulata (A.Berger) Klak, endemic
- Lampranthus egregius (L.Bolus) L.Bolus, endemic
- Lampranthus elegans (Jacq.) Schwantes, endemic
- Lampranthus emarginatoides (Haw.) N.E.Br. endemic
- Lampranthus emarginatus (L.) N.E.Br. endemic
  - Lampranthus emarginatus (L.) N.E.Br. var. puniceus(Jacq.) Schwantes, accepted as Lampranthus emarginatus (L.) N.E.Br. present
- Lampranthus ernestii (L.Bolus) L.Bolus, endemic
- Lampranthus erratus (Salm-Dyck) N.E.Br. accepted as Ruschia knysnana (L.Bolus) L.Bolus, present
- Lampranthus esterhuyseniae L.Bolus, endemic
- Lampranthus excedens (L.Bolus) L.Bolus, accepted as Oscularia excedens (L.Bolus) H.E.K.Hartmann, present
- Lampranthus eximius L.Bolus, endemic
- Lampranthus explanatus (L.Bolus) N.E.Br. endemic
- Lampranthus falcatus (L.) N.E.Br. endemic
  - Lampranthus falcatus (L.) N.E.Br. var. galpinii(L.Bolus) L.Bolus, accepted as Lampranthus vallis-gratiae (Schltr. & A.Berger) N.E.Br. present
- Lampranthus falciformis (Haw.) N.E.Br. endemic
  - Lampranthus falciformis (Haw.) N.E.Br. var. maritimus(L.Bolus) L.Bolus, accepted as Jordaaniella maritima (L.Bolus) Van Jaarsv. present
- Lampranthus fergusoniae (L.Bolus) L.Bolus, endemic
  - Lampranthus fergusoniae (L.Bolus) L.Bolus var. crassistigmaL.Bolus, accepted as Lampranthus fergusoniae (L.Bolus) L.Bolus, present
- Lampranthus filicaulis (Haw.) N.E.Br. endemic
- Lampranthus flexifolius (Haw.) N.E.Br. endemic
- Lampranthus flexilis (Haw.) N.E.Br. endemic
- Lampranthus foliosus L.Bolus, endemic
- Lampranthus formosus (Haw.) N.E.Br. endemic
- Lampranthus framesii (L.Bolus) N.E.Br. endemic
- Lampranthus francesiae H.E.K.Hartmann, accepted as Phiambolia unca (L.Bolus) Klak, present
- Lampranthus franciscii L.Bolus, accepted as Phiambolia franciscii (L.Bolus) Klak, present
- Lampranthus fugitans L.Bolus, endemic
- Lampranthus furvus (L.Bolus) N.E.Br. endemic
- Lampranthus galpiniae (L.Bolus) L.Bolus, endemic
- Lampranthus glaucoides (Haw.) N.E.Br. endemic
- Lampranthus glaucus (L.) N.E.Br. endemic
  - Lampranthus glaucus (L.) N.E.Br. var. tortuosus(Salm-Dyck) Schwantes, accepted as Lampranthus glaucus (L.) N.E.Br. indigenous
- Lampranthus globosus (L.Bolus) L.Bolus, endemic
- Lampranthus glomeratus (L.) N.E.Br. endemic
- Lampranthus godmaniae (L.Bolus) L.Bolus, endemic
  - Lampranthus godmaniae (L.Bolus) L.Bolus var. grandiflorus(L.Bolus) L.Bolus, accepted as Lampranthus haworthii (Haw.) N.E.Br. present
- Lampranthus gracilipes (L.Bolus) N.E.Br. endemic
  - Lampranthus gracilipes (L.Bolus) N.E.Br. forma luxurians L.Bolus, accepted as Lampranthus gracilipes (L.Bolus) N.E.Br. present
- Lampranthus guthrieae (L.Bolus) N.E.Br. accepted as Oscularia guthriae (L.Bolus) H.E.K.Hartmann, present
- Lampranthus gydouwensis L.Bolus, accepted as Phiambolia incumbens (L.Bolus) Klak, present
- Lampranthus hallii L.Bolus, endemic
- Lampranthus haworthii (Haw.) N.E.Br. endemic
- Lampranthus henricii (L.Bolus) N.E.Br. accepted as Ruschiella henricii (L.Bolus) Klak, endemic
- Lampranthus hiemalis (L.Bolus) L.Bolus, accepted as Ruschiella lunulata (A.Berger) Klak, endemic
- Lampranthus hoerleinianus (Dinter) Friedrich, indigenous
- Lampranthus holensis L.Bolus, endemic
- Lampranthus hollandii (L.Bolus) L.Bolus, endemic
- Lampranthus hurlingii (L.Bolus) L.Bolus, endemic
- Lampranthus imbricans (Haw.) N.E.Br. endemic
- Lampranthus immelmaniae (L.Bolus) N.E.Br. endemic
- Lampranthus inaequalis (Haw.) N.E.Br. endemic
- Lampranthus inconspicuus (Haw.) Schwantes, endemic
- Lampranthus incurvus (Haw.) Schwantes, endemic
- Lampranthus intervallaris L.Bolus, endemic
- Lampranthus laetus (L.Bolus) L.Bolus, endemic
- Lampranthus lavisii (L.Bolus) L.Bolus, endemic
  - Lampranthus lavisii (L.Bolus) L.Bolus var. concinnus L.Bolus, accepted as Lampranthus lavisii (L.Bolus) L.Bolus, indigenous
- Lampranthus laxifolius (L.Bolus) N.E.Br. endemic
- Lampranthus leightoniae (L.Bolus) L.Bolus, endemic
- Lampranthus leipoldtii (L.Bolus) L.Bolus, endemic
- Lampranthus leptaleon (Haw.) N.E.Br. endemic
- Lampranthus leptosepalus (L.Bolus) L.Bolus, endemic
- Lampranthus lewisiae (L.Bolus) L.Bolus, endemic
- Lampranthus liberalis (L.Bolus) L.Bolus, endemic
- Lampranthus littlewoodii L.Bolus, accepted as Lampranthus esterhuyseniae L.Bolus, endemic
- Lampranthus longisepalus L.Bolus, accepted as Hammeria meleagris (L.Bolus) Klak, present
- Lampranthus longistamineus (L.Bolus) N.E.Br. accepted as Lampranthus glaucus (L.) N.E.Br. endemic
- Lampranthus lunatus (Willd.) N.E.Br. accepted as Oscularia lunata (Willd.) H.E.K.Hartmann, present
- Lampranthus lunulatus (A.Berger) L.Bolus, accepted as Ruschiella lunulata (A.Berger) Klak, endemic
- Lampranthus macrocarpus (A.Berger) N.E.Br. endemic
- Lampranthus macrosepalus (L.Bolus) L.Bolus, endemic
- Lampranthus macrostigma L.Bolus, endemic
- Lampranthus magnificus (L.Bolus) N.E.Br. endemic
- Lampranthus marcidulus N.E.Br. endemic
- Lampranthus marginatus (L.Bolus) H.E.K.Hartmann, accepted as Phiambolia unca (L.Bolus) Klak, present
- Lampranthus mariae (L.Bolus) L.Bolus, accepted as Ruschiella henricii (L.Bolus) Klak, endemic
- Lampranthus martleyi (L.Bolus) L.Bolus, endemic
- Lampranthus maturus N.E.Br. endemic
- Lampranthus matutinus (L.Bolus) N.E.Br., endemic
- Lampranthus maximilianii (Schltr. & A.Berger) L.Bolus, accepted as Braunsia maximilianii (Schltr. & A.Berger) Schwantes, present
- Lampranthus meleagris (L.Bolus) L.Bolus, accepted as Hammeria meleagris (L.Bolus) Klak, present
- Lampranthus microsepalus L.Bolus, endemic
- Lampranthus microstigma (L.Bolus) N.E.Br. endemic
- Lampranthus middlemostii (L.Bolus) L.Bolus, endemic
- Lampranthus montaguensis (L.Bolus) L.Bolus, accepted as Ruschiella argentea (L.Bolus) Klak, endemic
- Lampranthus mucronatus L.Bolus, endemic
- Lampranthus multiradiatus (Jacq.) N.E.Br. endemic
- Lampranthus multiseriatus (L.Bolus) N.E.Br. endemic
- Lampranthus mutans (L.Bolus) N.E.Br. endemic
- Lampranthus mutatus (G.D.Rowley) H.E.K.Hartmann, accepted as Ruschia mutata G.D.Rowley, endemic
- Lampranthus nardouwensis (L.Bolus) L.Bolus, accepted as Ruschiella argentea (L.Bolus) Klak, endemic
- Lampranthus nelii L.Bolus, endemic
- Lampranthus neostayneri L.Bolus, endemic
- Lampranthus obconicus (L.Bolus) L.Bolus, endemic
- Lampranthus occultans L.Bolus, endemic
- Lampranthus ornatus L.Bolus, accepted as Oscularia ornata (L.Bolus) H.E.K.Hartmann, present
- Lampranthus otzenianus (Dinter) Friedrich, indigenous
- Lampranthus paardebergensis (L.Bolus) L.Bolus, accepted as Oscularia paardebergensis (L.Bolus) H.E.K.Hartmann, present
- Lampranthus paarlensis L.Bolus, endemic
- Lampranthus pakhuisensis (L.Bolus) L.Bolus, endemic
- Lampranthus pakpassensis H.E.K.Hartmann, accepted as Ruschiella lunulata (A.Berger) Klak, endemic
- Lampranthus palustris (L.Bolus) L.Bolus, accepted as Lampranthus glaucus (L.) N.E.Br. endemic
- Lampranthus parcus N.E.Br. endemic
- Lampranthus pauciflorus (L.Bolus) N.E.Br. endemic
- Lampranthus paucifolius (L.Bolus) N.E.Br. endemic
- Lampranthus peacockiae (L.Bolus) L.Bolus, endemic
- Lampranthus peersii (L.Bolus) N.E.Br. endemic
- Lampranthus perreptans L.Bolus, endemic
- Lampranthus persistens (L.Bolus) L.Bolus, accepted as Phiambolia persistens (L.Bolus) Klak, present
- Lampranthus piquetbergensis (L.Bolus) L.Bolus, accepted as Oscularia piquetbergensis (L.Bolus) H.E.K.Hartmann, present
- Lampranthus plautus N.E.Br. accepted as Lampranthus densipetalus (L.Bolus) L.Bolus, endemic
- Lampranthus pleniflorus L.Bolus, accepted as Ruschiella lunulata (A.Berger) Klak, endemic
- Lampranthus plenus (L.Bolus) L.Bolus, endemic
- Lampranthus pocockiae (L.Bolus) N.E.Br. endemic
- Lampranthus polyanthon (Haw.) N.E.Br. endemic
- Lampranthus praecipitatus (L.Bolus) L.Bolus, endemic
- Lampranthus prasinus L.Bolus, accepted as Oscularia prasina (L.Bolus) H.E.K.Hartmann, present
- Lampranthus primivernus (L.Bolus) L.Bolus, accepted as Oscularia primiverna (L.Bolus) H.E.K.Hartmann, present
- Lampranthus procumbens Klak, endemic
- Lampranthus productus (Haw.) N.E.Br. endemic
  - Lampranthus productus (Haw.) N.E.Br. var. lepidus(Haw.) Schwantes, accepted as Lampranthus productus (Haw.) N.E.Br. present
  - Lampranthus productus (Haw.) N.E.Br. var. purpureus (L.Bolus) L.Bolus, accepted as Lampranthus productus (Haw.) N.E.Br. present
- Lampranthus profundus (L.Bolus) H.E.K.Hartmann, endemic
- Lampranthus prominulus (L.Bolus) L.Bolus, endemic
- Lampranthus promontorii (L.Bolus) N.E.Br. endemic
- Lampranthus proximus L.Bolus, endemic
- Lampranthus purpureus L.Bolus, endemic
- Lampranthus rabiesbergensis (L.Bolus) L.Bolus, endemic
- Lampranthus recurvus (L.Bolus) Schwantes, endemic
- Lampranthus reptans (Aiton) N.E.Br. endemic
- Lampranthus roseus (Willd.) Schwantes, accepted as Lampranthus multiradiatus, endemic
- Lampranthus rubroluteus (L.Bolus) L.Bolus, endemic
- Lampranthus rupestris (L.Bolus) N.E.Br. endemic
- Lampranthus rustii (A.Berger) N.E.Br. endemic
- Lampranthus salicola (L.Bolus) L.Bolus, endemic
- Lampranthus salteri (L.Bolus) L.Bolus, endemic
- Lampranthus saturatus (L.Bolus) N.E.Br. endemic
- Lampranthus sauerae (L.Bolus) L.Bolus, endemic
- Lampranthus scaber (L.) N.E.Br. endemic
- Lampranthus schlechteri (Zahlbr.) L.Bolus, endemic
- Lampranthus serpens (L.Bolus) L.Bolus, accepted as Lampranthus reptans (Aiton) N.E.Br. endemic
- Lampranthus simulans L.Bolus, accepted as Erepsia simulans (L.Bolus) Klak, present
- Lampranthus sociorum (L.Bolus) N.E.Br. endemic
- Lampranthus sparsiflorus L.Bolus, endemic
- Lampranthus spectabilis (Haw.) N.E.Br. endemic
- Lampranthus spiniformis (Haw.) N.E.Br. endemic
- Lampranthus staminodiosus (L.Bolus) Schwantes, endemic
- Lampranthus stanfordiae L.Bolus, endemic
- Lampranthus stayneri (L.Bolus) N.E.Br. endemic
- Lampranthus steenbergensis (L.Bolus) L.Bolus, accepted as Oscularia steenbergensis (L.Bolus) H.E.K.Hartmann, present
- Lampranthus stenopetalus (L.Bolus) N.E.Br. endemic
- Lampranthus stenus (Haw.) N.E.Br. endemic
- Lampranthus stephanii (Schwantes) Schwantes, endemic
- Lampranthus sternens L.Bolus, endemic
- Lampranthus stipulaceus (L.) N.E.Br. endemic
- Lampranthus stoloniferus L.Bolus, accepted as Hammeria meleagris (L.Bolus) Klak, present
- Lampranthus suavissimus (L.Bolus) L.Bolus, indigenous
  - Lampranthus suavissimus (L.Bolus) L.Bolus var. oculatus(L.Bolus) L.Bolus, accepted as Lampranthus suavissimus (L.Bolus) L.Bolus, present
  - Lampranthus suavissimus (L.Bolus) L.Bolus var. suavissimus forma fera, accepted as Lampranthus suavissimus (L.Bolus) L.Bolus, present
- Lampranthus subaequalis (L.Bolus) L.Bolus, endemic
- Lampranthus sublaxus (L.Bolus) L.Bolus, endemic
- Lampranthus subrotundus L.Bolus, endemic
- Lampranthus subtruncatus L.Bolus, endemic
  - Lampranthus subtruncatus L.Bolus var. wupperthalensis L.Bolus, accepted as Lampranthus subtruncatus L.Bolus, present
- Lampranthus superans (L.Bolus) L.Bolus, accepted as Oscularia superans (L.Bolus) H.E.K.Hartmann, present
- Lampranthus swartbergensis (L.Bolus) N.E.Br. endemic
- Lampranthus swartkopensis Strohschn. endemic
- Lampranthus tegens (F.Muell.) N.E.Br. endemic
- Lampranthus tenuifolius (L.) N.E.Br. endemic
- Lampranthus tenuis L.Bolus, endemic
- Lampranthus thermarum (L.Bolus) L.Bolus, accepted as Oscularia thermarum (L.Bolus) H.E.K.Hartmann, present
- Lampranthus tulbaghensis (A.Berger) N.E.Br. endemic
- Lampranthus turbinatus (Jacq.) N.E.Br. endemic
- Lampranthus uncus (L.Bolus) Schwantes, accepted as Phiambolia unca (L.Bolus) Klak, present
- Lampranthus uniflorus (L.Bolus) L.Bolus, endemic
- Lampranthus vallis-gratiae (Schltr. & A.Berger) N.E.Br. endemic
- Lampranthus vanheerdei L.Bolus, accepted as Lampranthus esterhuyseniae L.Bolus, endemic
- Lampranthus vanputtenii (L.Bolus) N.E.Br. endemic
- Lampranthus vanzijliae (L.Bolus) N.E.Br. endemic
- Lampranthus variabilis (Haw.) N.E.Br. endemic
- Lampranthus verecundus (L.Bolus) N.E.Br. endemic
- Lampranthus vernalis (L.Bolus) L.Bolus, endemic
- Lampranthus vernicolor (L.Bolus) L.Bolus, accepted as Oscularia vernicolor (L.Bolus) H.E.K.Hartmann, present
- Lampranthus viatorum (L.Bolus) N.E.Br. accepted as Antimima viatorum (L.Bolus) Klak, present
- Lampranthus villiersii (L.Bolus) L.Bolus, endemic
- Lampranthus violaceus (DC.) Schwantes in H.Jacobsen, endemic
- Lampranthus virgatus L.Bolus, endemic
- Lampranthus vredenburgensis L.Bolus, accepted as Oscularia vredenburgensis (L.Bolus) H.E.K.Hartmann, present
- Lampranthus walgateae L.Bolus, endemic
- Lampranthus watermeyeri (L.Bolus) N.E.Br. endemic
- Lampranthus woodburniae (L.Bolus) N.E.Br. accepted as Lampranthus reptans (Aiton) N.E.Br. endemic
- Lampranthus wordsworthiae (L.Bolus) N.E.Br. endemic
- Lampranthus zeyheri (Salm-Dyck) N.E.Br. endemic

== Lapidaria ==
Genus Lapidaria:

- Lapidaria margaretae (Schwantes) Dinter & Schwantes, indigenous

== Leipoldtia ==
Genus Leipoldtia:

- Leipoldtia alborosea (L.Bolus) H.E.K.Hartmann & Stuber, indigenous
- Leipoldtia amplexicaulis (L.Bolus) L.Bolus forma amplexicaulis, accepted as Leipoldtia schultzei (Schltr. & Diels) Friedrich, present
  - Leipoldtia amplexicaulis (L.Bolus) L.Bolus forma fera L.Bolus, accepted as Leipoldtia schultzei (Schltr. & Diels) Friedrich, present
- Leipoldtia aprica (A.Berger) L.Bolus, accepted as Leipoldtia schultzei (Schltr. & Diels) Friedrich, present
- Leipoldtia brevifolia L.Bolus, accepted as Leipoldtia schultzei (Schltr. & Diels) Friedrich, present
- Leipoldtia britteniae (L.Bolus) L.Bolus, accepted as Leipoldtia schultzei (Schltr. & Diels) Friedrich, present
- Leipoldtia calandra (L.Bolus) L.Bolus, endemic
- Leipoldtia compacta L.Bolus, endemic
- Leipoldtia constricta (L.Bolus) L.Bolus, accepted as Leipoldtia schultzei (Schltr. & Diels) Friedrich, present
- Leipoldtia framesii L.Bolus, accepted as Leipoldtia laxa L.Bolus, present
- Leipoldtia frutescens (L.Bolus) H.E.K.Hartmann, indigenous
- Leipoldtia gigantea Klak, endemic
- Leipoldtia grandifolia L.Bolus, accepted as Leipoldtia weigangiana (Dinter) Dinter & Schwantes subsp. grandifolia (L.Bolus) H.E.K.Hartmann & S.R, present
- Leipoldtia herrei (Schwantes) Schwantes, accepted as Leipoldtia schultzei (Schltr. & Diels) Friedrich, present
- Leipoldtia jacobseniana Schwantes, accepted as Leipoldtia schultzei (Schltr. & Diels) Friedrich, present
- Leipoldtia klaverensis L.Bolus, endemic
- Leipoldtia laxa L.Bolus, endemic
- Leipoldtia littlewoodii L.Bolus, accepted as Leipoldtia weigangiana (Dinter) Dinter & Schwantes subsp. littlewoodii (L.Bolus) H.E.K.Hartmann & S.
- Leipoldtia lunata H.E.K.Hartmann & S.Rust, endemic
- Leipoldtia nelii L.Bolus, accepted as Leipoldtia schultzei (Schltr. & Diels) Friedrich, present
- Leipoldtia nevillei Klak, endemic
- Leipoldtia pauciflora L.Bolus, accepted as Leipoldtia schultzei (Schltr. & Diels) Friedrich, present
- Leipoldtia rosea L.Bolus, endemic
- Leipoldtia schultzei (Schltr. & Diels) Friedrich, endemic
- Leipoldtia uniflora L.Bolus, endemic
- Leipoldtia weigangiana (Dinter) Dinter & Schwantes, indigenous
  - Leipoldtia weigangiana (Dinter) Dinter & Schwantes subsp. grandifolia (L.Bolus) H.E.K.Hartmann & S.R, indigenous
  - Leipoldtia weigangiana (Dinter) Dinter & Schwantes subsp. littlewoodii (L.Bolus) H.E.K.Hartmann & S. indigenous
  - Leipoldtia weigangiana (Dinter) Dinter & Schwantes subsp. weigangiana, indigenous

== Lithops ==
Genus Lithops:

- Lithops aucampiae L.Bolus, indigenous
- Lithops aucampiae L.Bolus subsp. aucampiae endemic
  - Lithops aucampiae L.Bolus subsp. aucampiae var. koelemanii, accepted as Lithops aucampiae L.Bolus subsp. aucampiae pres
  - Lithops aucampiae L.Bolus subsp. euniceae (de Boer) D.T.Cole, endemic
  - Lithops aucampiae L.Bolus subsp. euniceae (de Boer) D.T.Cole var. fluminalis, accepted as Lithops aucampiae L.Bolus subsp. euniceae (de Boer) D.T.Cole, present
  - Lithops aucampiae L.Bolus var. euniceae de Boer, accepted as Lithops aucampiae L.Bolus subsp. euniceae (de Boer) D.T.Cole, present
  - Lithops aucampiae L.Bolus var. fluminalis D.T.Cole, accepted as Lithops aucampiae L.Bolus subsp. euniceae (de Boer) D.T.Cole, present
- Lithops aurantiaca L.Bolus, accepted as Lithops hookeri (A.Berger) Schwantes, present
- Lithops bromfieldii L.Bolus, endemic
  - Lithops bromfieldii L.Bolus var. glaudinae (de Boer) D.T.Cole, accepted as Lithops bromfieldii L.Bolus, present
  - Lithops bromfieldii L.Bolus var. insularis (L.Bolus) B.Fearn, accepted as Lithops bromfieldii L.Bolus, present
  - Lithops bromfieldii] L.Bolus var. mennellii (L.Bolus) B.Fearn, accepted as Lithops bromfieldii L.Bolus, present
- Lithops christinae de Boer, accepted as Lithops schwantesii Dinter subsp. schwantesii pres
- Lithops coleorum S.A.Hammer & Uijs, endemic
- Lithops comptonii L.Bolus, endemic
  - Lithops comptonii L.Bolus var. divergens (L.Bolus) B.Fearn, accepted as Lithops divergens L.Bolus, present
  - Lithops comptonii L.Bolus var. divergens (L.Bolus) B.Fearn forma amethystina, accepted as Lithops divergens L.Bolus, present
- Lithops comptonii L.Bolus var. viridis (H.A.Luckh.) B.Fearn, accepted as Lithops viridis H.A.Luckh. present
- Lithops comptonii L.Bolus var. weberi (Nel) D.T.Cole, accepted as Lithops comptonii L.Bolus, present
- Lithops dabneri L.Bolus, accepted as Lithops hookeri (A.Berger) Schwantes, present
- Lithops deboeri Schwantes, accepted as Lithops villetii L.Bolus subsp. deboeri (Schwantes) D.T.Cole, present
- Lithops dinteri Schwantes, indigenous
  - Lithops dinteri Schwantes subsp. dinteri var. brevis, accepted as Lithops dinteri Schwantes subsp. dinteri, present
  - Lithops dinteri Schwantes subsp. frederici (D.T.Cole) D.T.Cole, endemic
  - Lithops dinteri Schwantes var. frederici D.T.Cole, accepted as Lithops dinteri Schwantes subsp. frederici (D.T.Cole) D.T.Cole, present
- Lithops diutina L.Bolus, accepted as Lithops marmorata (N.E.Br.) N.E.Br. present
- Lithops divergens L.Bolus, endemic
  - Lithops divergens L.Bolus var. amethystina de Boer, accepted as Lithops divergens L.Bolus
- Lithops dorotheae Nel, endemic
- Lithops eksteeniae L.Bolus, accepted as Lithops dorotheae Nel, present
- Lithops elisae de Boer, accepted as Lithops marmorata (N.E.Br.) N.E.Br. present
- Lithops framesii L.Bolus, accepted as Lithops marmorata (N.E.Br.) N.E.Br. present
- Lithops fulleri N.E.Br. var. brunneade Boer, accepted as Lithops julii (Dinter & Schwantes) N.E.Br. subsp. fulleri (N.E.Br.) B.Fearn, present
  - Lithops fulleri N.E.Br. var. chrysocephala(Nel) de Boer, accepted as Lithops julii (Dinter & Schwantes) N.E.Br. subsp. julii present
  - Lithops fulleri N.E.Br. var. fulleri, accepted as Lithops julii (Dinter & Schwantes) N.E.Br. subsp. fulleri (N.E.Br.) B.Fearn, present
  - Lithops fulleri N.E.Br. var. kennedyi de Boer, accepted as Lithops villetii L.Bolus subsp. kennedyi (de Boer) D.T.Cole, present
  - Lithops fulleri N.E.Br. var. ochracea de Boer, accepted as Lithops hallii de Boer, present
  - Lithops fulleri N.E.Br. var. rouxii (de Boer) D.T.Cole, accepted as Lithops julii (Dinter & Schwantes) N.E.Br. subsp. fulleri (N.E.Br.) B.Fearn, present
  - Lithops fulleri N.E.Br. var. tapscottii L.Bolus, accepted as Lithops julii (Dinter & Schwantes) N.E.Br. subsp. fulleri (N.E.Br.) B.Fearn, present
- Lithops fulviceps (N.E.Br.) N.E.Br. indigenous
  - Lithops fulviceps N.E.Br. var. laevigata D.T.Cole, endemic
- Lithops geyeri Nel, endemic
- Lithops glaudinae de Boer, accepted as Lithops bromfieldii L.Bolus, present
- Lithops hallii de Boer, endemic
  - Lithops hallii de Boer var. ochracea (de Boer) D.T.Cole, accepted as Lithops hallii de Boer, present
- Lithops helmutii L.Bolus, endemic
- Lithops herrei L.Bolus, indigenous
- Lithops herrei L.Bolus forma albiflora H.Jacobsen, accepted as Lithops marmorata (N.E.Br.) N.E.Br. present
- Lithops herrei L.Bolus var. geyeri(Nel) de Boer & Boom, accepted as Lithops geyeri Nel, present
- Lithops herrei L.Bolus var. plena L.Bolus, accepted as Lithops herrei L.Bolus, present
- Lithops hillii L.Bolus, accepted as Lithops geyeri Nel, present
- Lithops hookeri (A.Berger) Schwantes, endemic
- Lithops hookeri (A.Berger) Schwantes var. dabneri (L.Bolus) D.T.Cole, accepted as Lithops hookeri (A.Berger) Schwantes, present
  - Lithops hookeri (A.Berger) Schwantes var. elephina (D.T.Cole) D.T.Cole, accepted as Lithops hookeri (A.Berger) Schwantes, present
  - Lithops hookeri (A.Berger) Schwantes var. lutea (de Boer) D.T.Cole, accepted as Lithops hookeri (A.Berger) Schwantes, present
  - Lithops hookeri (A.Berger) Schwantes var. marginata (Nel) D.T.Cole, accepted as Lithops hookeri (A.Berger) Schwantes, present
  - Lithops hookeri (A.Berger) Schwantes var. subfenestrata (de Boer) D.T.Cole, accepted as Lithops hookeri (A.Berger) Schwantes, present
  - Lithops hookeri (A.Berger) Schwantes var. susannae (D.T.Cole) D.T.Cole, accepted as Lithops hookeri (A.Berger) Schwantes, present
- Lithops inae Nel, accepted as Lithops verruculosa Nel, present
- Lithops insularis L.Bolus, accepted as Lithops bromfieldii L.Bolus, present
- Lithops julii (Dinter & Schwantes) N.E.Br. indigenous
  - Lithops julii (Dinter & Schwantes) N.E.Br. subsp. fulleri (N.E.Br.) B.Fearn, endemic
  - Lithops julii (Dinter & Schwantes) N.E.Br. subsp. fulleri (N.E.Br.) B.Fearn var. brunnea, accepted as Lithops julii (Dinter & Schwantes) N.E.Br. subsp. fulleri (N.E.Br.) B.Fearn, present
  - Lithops julii (Dinter & Schwantes) N.E.Br. subsp. fulleri (N.E.Br.) B.Fearn var. rouxii, accepted as Lithops julii (Dinter & Schwantes) N.E.Br. subsp. fulleri (N.E.Br.) B.Fearn
- Lithops koelemanii de Boer, accepted as Lithops aucampiae L.Bolus subsp. aucampiae, present
- Lithops lesliei (N.E.Br.) N.E.Br. indigenous
  - Lithops lesliei (N.E.Br.) N.E.Br. forma minor (de Boer) B.Fearn, accepted as Lithops lesliei (N.E.Br.) N.E.Br. subsp. lesliei, present
  - Lithops lesliei (N.E.Br.) N.E.Br. subsp. burchellii D.T.Cole, endemic
  - Lithops lesliei (N.E.Br.) N.E.Br. subsp. lesliei, indigenous
  - Lithops lesliei (N.E.Br.) N.E.Br. subsp. lesliei var. hornii, accepted as Lithops lesliei (N.E.Br.) N.E.Br. subsp. lesliei, present
  - Lithops lesliei (N.E.Br.) N.E.Br. subsp. lesliei var. mariae, accepted as Lithops lesliei (N.E.Br.) N.E.Br. subsp. lesliei, present
  - Lithops lesliei (N.E.Br.) N.E.Br. subsp. lesliei var. minor, accepted as Lithops lesliei (N.E.Br.) N.E.Br. subsp. lesliei, present
  - Lithops lesliei (N.E.Br.) N.E.Br. subsp. lesliei var. rubrobrunnea, accepted as Lithops lesliei (N.E.Br.) N.E.Br. subsp. lesliei, present
  - Lithops lesliei (N.E.Br.) N.E.Br. subsp. lesliei var. venteri, accepted as Lithops lesliei (N.E.Br.) N.E.Br. subsp. lesliei, present
  - Lithops lesliei (N.E.Br.) N.E.Br. var. maraisii de Boer, accepted as Lithops lesliei (N.E.Br.) N.E.Br. subsp. lesliei, present
- Lithops localis (N.E.Br.) Schwantes, endemic
- Lithops marginata Nel, accepted as Lithops hookeri (A.Berger) Schwantes, present
- Lithops marmorata (N.E.Br.) N.E.Br. endemic
  - Lithops marmorata (N.E.Br.) N.E.Br. var. elisae (de Boer) D.T.Cole, accepted as Lithops marmorata (N.E.Br.) N.E.Br. present
- Lithops maughanii N.E.Br. accepted as Lithops julii (Dinter & Schwantes) N.E.Br. subsp. fulleri (N.E.Br.) B.Fearn, present
- Lithops mennellii L.Bolus, accepted as Lithops bromfieldii L.Bolus, present
- Lithops meyeri L.Bolus, endemic
- Lithops naureeniae D.T.Cole, endemic
- Lithops olivacea L.Bolus, endemic
  - Lithops olivacea L.Bolus var. nebrownii D.T.Cole, accepted as Lithops olivacea L.Bolus, present
- Lithops otzeniana Nel, endemic
  - Lithops otzeniana Nel var. weberi(Nel) B.Fearn, accepted as Lithops comptonii L.Bolus, present
- Lithops salicola L.Bolus, endemic
- Lithops terricolor N.E.Br. accepted as Lithops localis (N.E.Br.) Schwantes, present
- Lithops translucens L.Bolus, accepted as Lithops herrei L.Bolus, present
- Lithops umdausensis L.Bolus, accepted as Lithops marmorata (N.E.Br.) N.E.Br. present
- Lithops verruculosa Nel, endemic
  - Lithops verruculosa Nel var. glabra de Boer, accepted as Lithops verruculosa Nel, present
  - Lithops verruculosa Nel var. inae (Nel) de Boer & Boom, accepted as Lithops verruculosa Nel, present
- Lithops villetii L.Bolus, indigenous
  - Lithops villetii L.Bolus subsp. deboeri (Schwantes) D.T.Cole, endemic
  - Lithops villetii L.Bolus subsp. kennedyi (de Boer) D.T.Cole, endemic
  - Lithops villetii L.Bolus subsp. villetii, endemic
  - Lithops villetii L.Bolus var. deboeri (Schwantes) D.T.Cole, accepted as Lithops villetii L.Bolus subsp. deboeri (Schwantes) D.T.Cole, present
  - Lithops villetii L.Bolus var. kennedyi (de Boer) D.T.Cole, accepted as Lithops villetii L.Bolus subsp. kennedyi (de Boer) D.T.Cole, present
- Lithops viridis H.A.Luckh. endemic
- Lithops weberi Nel, accepted as Lithops comptonii L.Bolus, present

== Litocarpus ==
Genus Litocarpus:

- Litocarpus cordifolius (L.f.) L.Bolus, accepted as Mesembryanthemum cordifolium L.f. indigenous

== Machairophyllum ==
Genus Machairophyllum:

- Machairophyllum acuminatum L.Bolus, accepted as Machairophyllum bijliae (N.E.Br.) L.Bolus, present
- Machairophyllum albidum (L.) Schwantes, endemic
- Machairophyllum baxteri L.Bolus, accepted as Machairophyllum bijliae (N.E.Br.) L.Bolus, present
- Machairophyllum bijliae (N.E.Br.) L.Bolus, endemic
- Machairophyllum brevifolium L.Bolus, endemic
- Machairophyllum cookii (L.Bolus) Schwantes, accepted as Machairophyllum albidum (L.) Schwantes, present
- Machairophyllum latifolium L.Bolus, accepted as Machairophyllum brevifolium L.Bolus, present
- Machairophyllum stayneri L.Bolus, endemic
- Machairophyllum stenopetalum L.Bolus, accepted as Machairophyllum bijliae (N.E.Br.) L.Bolus, present
- Machairophyllum vanbredai L.Bolus, accepted as Machairophyllum bijliae (N.E.Br.) L.Bolus, present

== Malephora ==
Genus Malephora:

- Malephora crassa (L.Bolus) H.Jacobsen & Schwantes, endemic
- Malephora crocea (Jacq.) Schwantes, endemic
  - Malephora crocea (Jacq.) Schwantes var. purpureo-crocea (Haw.) H.Jacobsen, accepted as Malephora purpureo-crocea (Haw.) Schwantes, present
- Malephora flavo-crocea (Haw.) H.Jacobsen & Schwantes, endemic
- Malephora framesii (L.Bolus) H.Jacobsen & Schwantes, endemic
- Malephora herrei (Schwantes) Schwantes, endemic
- Malephora latipetala (L.Bolus) H.Jacobsen & Schwantes, endemic
- Malephora lutea (Haw.) Schwantes, endemic
- Malephora luteola (Haw.) Schwantes, endemic
- Malephora mollis (Aiton) N.E.Br. endemic
- Malephora ochracea (A.Berger) H.E.K.Hartmann, endemic
- Malephora pienaarii Van Jaarsv. endemic
- Malephora purpureo-crocea (Haw.) Schwantes, endemic
- Malephora smithii (L.Bolus) H.E.K.Hartmann, endemic
- Malephora thunbergii (Haw.) Schwantes, endemic
- Malephora uitenhagensis (L.Bolus) H.Jacobsen & Schwantes, endemic
- Malephora verruculoides (Sond.) Schwantes, endemic

== Marlothistella ==
Genus Marlothistella:

- Marlothistella stenophylla (L.Bolus) S.A.Hammer, endemic
- Marlothistella uniondalensis Schwantes, endemic

== Maughaniella ==
Genus Maughaniella:

- Maughaniella luckhoffii (L.Bolus) L.Bolus, accepted as Diplosoma luckhoffii (L.Bolus) Schwantes ex Ihlenf. present

== Mentocalyx ==
Genus Mentocalyx:

- Mentocalyx velutinum (L.Bolus) Schwantes, accepted as Gibbaeum velutinum (L.Bolus) Schwantes, indigenous

== Mesembryanthemum ==
Genus Mesembryanthemum:

- Mesembryanthemum aitonis Jacq. endemic
- Mesembryanthemum alatum (L.Bolus) L.Bolus, accepted as Mesembryanthemum guerichianum Pax, indigenous
- Mesembryanthemum albatum L.Bolus, accepted as Juttadinteria albata (L.Bolus) L.Bolus, present
- Mesembryanthemum alboroseum L.Bolus, accepted as Mesembryanthemum tetragonum Thunb. present
- Mesembryanthemum amabile (Gerbaulet & Struck) Klak, endemic
- Mesembryanthemum amplectens L.Bolus, endemic
- Mesembryanthemum anatomicum Haw. var. emarcidum (Thunb.) DC. accepted as Mesembryanthemum emarcidum Thunb. indigenous
  - Mesembryanthemum anatomicum Haw. var. fragile Haw. accepted as Mesembryanthemum emarcidum Thunb. present
- Mesembryanthemum angulatum Thunb. accepted as Mesembryanthemum aitonis Jacq. indigenous
  - Mesembryanthemum angulatum Thunb. var. ovatum (Thunb.) Sond. accepted as Mesembryanthemum aitonis Jacq. indigenous
- Mesembryanthemum annuum L.Bolus, accepted as Mesembryanthemum stenandrum (L.Bolus) L.Bolus, present
- Mesembryanthemum apiatum N.E.Br. accepted as Conophytum bilobum (Marloth) N.E.Br. subsp. bilobum var. bilobum, present
- Mesembryanthemum archeri (L.Bolus) Klak, endemic
- Mesembryanthemum arenosum L.Bolus, accepted as Lampranthus lavisii (L.Bolus) L.Bolus, indigenous
- Mesembryanthemum arenosum Schinz, indigenous
- Mesembryanthemum aristulatum Sond. accepted as Antimima aristulata (Sond.) Chess. & Gideon F.Sm. indigenous
- Mesembryanthemum articulatum Thunb. indigenous
- Mesembryanthemum auratum Sond. accepted as Mesembryanthemum nitidum Haw. indigenous
- Mesembryanthemum aureum Thunb. accepted as Mesembryanthemum nitidum Haw. indigenous
- Mesembryanthemum ausanum Dinter & A.Berger, accepted as Mesembryanthemum tetragonum Thunb. present
- Mesembryanthemum barklyi N.E.Br. indigenous
- Mesembryanthemum baylissii (L.Bolus) Klak, endemic
- Mesembryanthemum bellidiflorum L. accepted as Acrodon bellidiflorus (L.) N.E.Br. present
- Mesembryanthemum bellum (N.E.Br.) Dinter, accepted as Lithops karasmontana (Dinter & Schwantes) N.E.Br. subsp. bella (N.E.Br.) D.T.Cole
- Mesembryanthemum bibracteatum Eckl. & Zeyh. accepted as Bergeranthus multiceps (Salm-Dyck) Schwantes, indigenous
- Mesembryanthemum bicorne Sond. endemic
- Mesembryanthemum bilobum Marloth, accepted as Conophytum bilobum (Marloth) N.E.Br. subsp. bilobum var. bilobum, present
- Mesembryanthemum blandum Haw. accepted as Lampranthus multiradiatus (Jacq.) N.E.Br. indigenous
- Mesembryanthemum brachyphyllum Welw. accepted as Lampranthus glaucus (L.) N.E.Br. indigenous
- Mesembryanthemum breve L.Bolus, accepted as Mesembryanthemum crystallinum L. present
- Mesembryanthemum brevicarpum (L.Bolus) Klak, indigenous
- Mesembryanthemum bulletrapense Klak, endemic
- Mesembryanthemum caducum Klak, accepted as Mesembryanthemum flavidum Klak, indigenous
- Mesembryanthemum calamiforme L. accepted as Cylindrophyllum calamiforme (L.) Schwantes, present
- Mesembryanthemum canaliculatum Haw. endemic
- Mesembryanthemum capillaceum L.Bolus, accepted as Lampranthus falcatus (L.) N.E.Br. indigenous
- Mesembryanthemum carneum Haw. accepted as Mesembryanthemum spinuliferum Haw. indigenous
- Mesembryanthemum caudatum L.Bolus, endemic
- Mesembryanthemum chrysophthalmum (Gerbaulet & Struck) Klak, endemic
- Mesembryanthemum chrysum L.Bolus, accepted as Mesembryanthemum excavatum L.Bolus, present
- Mesembryanthemum citrinum L.Bolus, accepted as Lampranthus glaucus (L.) N.E.Br. indigenous
- Mesembryanthemum clandestinum Haw. endemic
- Mesembryanthemum commutatum A.Berger, accepted as Mesembryanthemum grossum Aiton, indigenous
- Mesembryanthemum comptum N.E.Br. accepted as Antimima aristulata (Sond.) Chess. & Gideon F.Sm. indigenous
- Mesembryanthemum corallinum Thunb. endemic
- Mesembryanthemum cordifolium L.f. indigenous
- Mesembryanthemum coriarium Burch. ex N.E.Br. indigenous
- Mesembryanthemum crassicaule Haw. endemic
- Mesembryanthemum cryocalyx L.Bolus, accepted as Mesembryanthemum longistylum DC. indigenous
- Mesembryanthemum cryptanthum Hook.f. indigenous
- Mesembryanthemum crystallino-papillosum Bolus ex Fedde & J.Schust. accepted as Mesembryanthemum oculatum N.E.Br. indigenous
- Mesembryanthemum crystallinum L. indigenous
- Mesembryanthemum crystallophanes Eckl. & Zeyh. accepted as Mesembryanthemum aitonis Jacq. indigenous
- Mesembryanthemum cylindricum Haw. accepted as Calamophyllum cylindricum (Haw.) Schwantes, present
- Mesembryanthemum cymosum L.Bolus, accepted as Ruschia pungens (A.Berger) H.Jacobsen, indigenous
- Mesembryanthemum damaranum N.E.Br. accepted as Lithops karasmontana (Dinter & Schwantes) N.E.Br. subsp. karasmontana
- Mesembryanthemum deciduum (L.Bolus) Klak, endemic
- Mesembryanthemum decurrens (L.Bolus) N.E.Br. accepted as Ruschia decurrens L.Bolus$
- Mesembryanthemum decurvatum (L.Bolus) Klak, endemic
- Mesembryanthemum defoliatum Haw. accepted as Mesembryanthemum noctiflorum L. subsp. defoliatum (Haw.) Klak, indigenous
- Mesembryanthemum dejagerae (L.Bolus) N.E.Br. accepted as Ruschia dejagerae L.Bolus, present
- Mesembryanthemum deliciosum L.Bolus, accepted as Carpobrotus deliciosus (L.Bolus) L.Bolus, present
- Mesembryanthemum delum L.Bolus, endemic
- Mesembryanthemum densipetalum L.Bolus, accepted as Lampranthus densipetalus (L.Bolus) L.Bolus, indigenous
- Mesembryanthemum difforme Thunb. accepted as Cheiridopsis namaquensis (Sond.) H.E.K.Hartmann, present
- Mesembryanthemum digitatum Aiton, endemic
  - Mesembryanthemum digitatum Aiton subsp. digitatum, endemic
  - Mesembryanthemum digitatum Aiton subsp. littlewoodii (L.Bolus) Klak, endemic
- Mesembryanthemum digitiforme Thunb. accepted as Mesembryanthemum digitatum Aiton subsp. digitatum, present
- Mesembryanthemum dimidiatum Haw. accepted as Carpobrotus dimidiatus (Haw.) L.Bolus, present
- Mesembryanthemum dinteri Engl. indigenous
- Mesembryanthemum emarcidum Thunb. endemic
- Mesembryanthemum englishiae L.Bolus, endemic
- Mesembryanthemum eurystigmatum Gerbaulet, endemic
- Mesembryanthemum exalatum (Gerbaulet) Klak, endemic
- Mesembryanthemum excavatum L.Bolus, endemic
- Mesembryanthemum excedens L.Bolus, accepted as Oscularia excedens (L.Bolus) H.E.K.Hartmann, present
- Mesembryanthemum expansum L. endemic
- Mesembryanthemum falcatum L. accepted as Lampranthus falcatus (L.) N.E.Br. indigenous
  - Mesembryanthemum falcatum L. var. galpinii L.Bolus, accepted as Lampranthus falcatus (L.) N.E.Br. indigenous
- Mesembryanthemum fastigiatum Thunb. endemic
- Mesembryanthemum flavidum Klak, endemic
- Mesembryanthemum gariepense (Gerbaulet & Struck) Klak, endemic
- Mesembryanthemum gariusanum Dinter, indigenous
- Mesembryanthemum geniculiflorum L. indigenous
- Mesembryanthemum glareicola (Klak) Klak, endemic
- Mesembryanthemum glaucum L. accepted as Lampranthus glaucus (L.) N.E.Br. indigenous
  - Mesembryanthemum glaucum L. var. tortuosum Salm-Dyck, accepted as Lampranthus glaucus (L.) N.E.Br. indigenous
- Mesembryanthemum glaucus (L.) Rothm. accepted as Lampranthus glaucus (L.) N.E.Br. indigenous
- Mesembryanthemum graniticum L.Bolus, accepted as Antimima granitica (L.Bolus) H.E.K.Hartmann, indigenous
- Mesembryanthemum granulicaule Haw. indigenous
- Mesembryanthemum grossum Aiton, endemic
- Mesembryanthemum guerichianum Pax, indigenous
- Mesembryanthemum haeckelianum A.Berger, endemic
- Mesembryanthemum halenbergense Dinter & Schwantes, accepted as Conophytum halenbergense (Dinter & Schwantes) N.E.Br. present
- Mesembryanthemum hesperanthum L.Bolus, accepted as Mesembryanthemum longistylum DC. indigenous
- Mesembryanthemum holense Klak, endemic
- Mesembryanthemum horridum Koutnik & Lavis, accepted as Mesembryanthemum guerichianum Pax, present
- Mesembryanthemum hypertrophicum Dinter, indigenous
- Mesembryanthemum inachabense Engl. indigenous
- Mesembryanthemum incurvum Haw. var. multiradiatum (Jacq.) DC. accepted as Lampranthus multiradiatus (Jacq.) N.E.Br. indigenous
- Mesembryanthemum inornatum L.Bolus, accepted as Mesembryanthemum nodiflorum L. present
- Mesembryanthemum intransparens L.Bolus var. laxum (L.Bolus) L.Bolus, accepted as Mesembryanthemum guerichianum Pax, present
- Mesembryanthemum intricatum N.E.Br. accepted as Ruschia intricata (N.E.Br.) H.E.K.Hartmann & Stuber, present
- Mesembryanthemum johannis-winkleri Dinter & Schwantes, accepted as Conophytum pageae (N.E.Br.) N.E.Br. present
- Mesembryanthemum jucundum N.E.Br. accepted as Conophytum jucundum (N.E.Br.) N.E.Br. subsp. jucundum, present
- Mesembryanthemum junceum Haw. endemic
- Mesembryanthemum juritzii L.Bolus, accepted as Carpobrotus dimidiatus (Haw.) L.Bolus, present
- Mesembryanthemum karrooense L.Bolus, accepted as Mesembryanthemum guerichianum Pax, present
- Mesembryanthemum knolfonteinense Klak, indigenous
- Mesembryanthemum labyrintheum N.E.Br. accepted as Conophytum minimum (Haw.) N.E.Br. present
- Mesembryanthemum ladismithiense Klak, endemic
- Mesembryanthemum lanceolatum Haw. accepted as Mesembryanthemum aitonis Jacq. indigenous
- Mesembryanthemum lanceum Thunb. accepted as Mesembryanthemum pallens Aiton subsp. lanceum (Thunb.) Klak, indigenous
- Mesembryanthemum lancifolium (L.Bolus) Klak, endemic
- Mesembryanthemum latipetalum (L.Bolus) Klak, endemic
- Mesembryanthemum latisepalum (L.Bolus) L.Bolus, accepted as Mesembryanthemum guerichianum Pax$
- Mesembryanthemum latum L.Bolus, accepted as Lampranthus densipetalus (L.Bolus) L.Bolus, indigenous
- Mesembryanthemum lavisii L.Bolus, accepted as Lampranthus lavisii (L.Bolus) L.Bolus, indigenous
- Mesembryanthemum leptarthron A.Berger, endemic
- Mesembryanthemum lericheanum Dinter & Schwantes, accepted as Lithops karasmontana (Dinter & Schwantes) N.E.Br. subsp. karasmontana
- Mesembryanthemum liebendalense L.Bolus, accepted as Mesembryanthemum stenandrum (L.Bolus) L.Bolus, present
- Mesembryanthemum lignescens (L.Bolus) Klak, indigenous
- Mesembryanthemum ligneum (L.Bolus) Klak, indigenous
- Mesembryanthemum lilliputanum Klak, endemic
- Mesembryanthemum limbatum N.E.Br. accepted as Antimima granitica (L.Bolus) H.E.K.Hartmann, indigenous
- Mesembryanthemum linearifolium L.Bolus, accepted as Mesembryanthemum longistylum DC. indigenous
- Mesembryanthemum longipapillosum Dinter, indigenous
- Mesembryanthemum longispinulum Haw. accepted as Mesembryanthemum grossum Aiton, indigenous
- Mesembryanthemum longispinulum Salm-Dyck, accepted as Mesembryanthemum grossum Aiton, indigenous
- Mesembryanthemum longistamineum L.Bolus, accepted as Lampranthus glaucus (L.) N.E.Br. indigenous
- Mesembryanthemum longistylum DC. endemic
- Mesembryanthemum loratum Haw. accepted as Mesembryanthemum pallens Aiton subsp. pallens, present
- Mesembryanthemum louiseae L.Bolus, accepted as Mesembryanthemum paulum (N.E.Br.) L.Bolus, indigenous
- Mesembryanthemum macrophyllum L.Bolus, accepted as Mesembryanthemum barklyi N.E.Br. present
- Mesembryanthemum macrostigma L.Bolus, accepted as Mesembryanthemum guerichianum Pax, present
- Mesembryanthemum maritimum L.Bolus, accepted as Jordaaniella maritima (L.Bolus) Van Jaarsv. indigenous
- Mesembryanthemum marlothii Pax, indigenous
- Mesembryanthemum melanospermum Dinter, accepted as Mesembryanthemum ligneum (L.Bolus) Klak, indigenous
- Mesembryanthemum multiceps Salm-Dyck, accepted as Bergeranthus multiceps (Salm-Dyck) Schwantes, indigenous
- Mesembryanthemum multiradiatum Jacq. accepted as Lampranthus multiradiatus (Jacq.) N.E.Br. indigenous
- Mesembryanthemum napierense Klak, endemic
- Mesembryanthemum neglectum (S.M.Pierce & Gerbaulet) Klak, indigenous
- Mesembryanthemum neilsoniae (L.Bolus) L.Bolus, accepted as Mesembryanthemum guerichianum Pax, indigenous
- Mesembryanthemum neofoliosum Klak, endemic
- Mesembryanthemum nevillei N.E.Br. accepted as Conophytum obcordellum (Haw.) N.E.Br. subsp. obcordellum var. obcordellum, present
- Mesembryanthemum nitidum Haw. endemic
- Mesembryanthemum noctiflorum L. indigenous
  - Mesembryanthemum noctiflorum L. subsp. defoliatum (Haw.) Klak, endemic
  - Mesembryanthemum noctiflorum L. subsp. noctiflorum, indigenous
  - Mesembryanthemum noctiflorum L. subsp. stramineum (Haw.) Klak, indigenous
  - Mesembryanthemum noctiflorum L. var. stramineum (Haw.) Haw. accepted as Mesembryanthemum noctiflorum L. subsp. stramineum (Haw.) Klak, indigenous
- Mesembryanthemum nodiflorum L. indigenous
- Mesembryanthemum nucifer (Ihlenf. & Bittrich) Klak, indigenous
- Mesembryanthemum obconellum Haw. accepted as Conophytum obcordellum (Haw.) N.E.Br. subsp. obcordellum var. obcordellum, present
- Mesembryanthemum obcordellum Haw. accepted as Conophytum obcordellum (Haw.) N.E.Br. subsp. obcordellum var. obcordellum, present
- Mesembryanthemum obmetale N.E.Br. accepted as Conophytum minimum (Haw.) N.E.Br. present
- Mesembryanthemum obsubulatum Haw. accepted as Cylindrophyllum obsubulatum (Haw.) Schwantes, present
- Mesembryanthemum occidentale Klak, endemic
- Mesembryanthemum oculatum N.E.Br. indigenous
- Mesembryanthemum olivaceum Schltr. accepted as Mesembryanthemum tenuiflorum Jacq. indigenous
- Mesembryanthemum orpenii N.E.Br. accepted as Prepodesma orpenii (N.E.Br.) N.E.Br. present
- Mesembryanthemum oubergense (L.Bolus) Klak, endemic
- Mesembryanthemum ovatum Thunb. accepted as Mesembryanthemum aitonis Jacq. indigenous
- Mesembryanthemum pachypus L.Bolus, accepted as Mesembryanthemum fastigiatum Thunb. present
- Mesembryanthemum pageae N.E.Br. accepted as Conophytum pageae (N.E.Br.) N.E.Br. present
- Mesembryanthemum pallens Aiton, endemic
  - Mesembryanthemum pallens Aiton subsp. lanceum (Thunb.) Klak, endemic
  - Mesembryanthemum pallens Aiton subsp. lutea (L.Bolus) Gerbaulet, accepted as Mesembryanthemum pallens Aiton subsp. luteum (L.Bolus) Klak, indigenous
  - Mesembryanthemum pallens Aiton subsp. luteum (L.Bolus) Klak, endemic
  - Mesembryanthemum pallens Aiton subsp. namaquense (Gerbaulet) Klak, endemic
  - Mesembryanthemum pallens Aiton subsp. pallens, endemic
- Mesembryanthemum pallescens Haw. accepted as Mesembryanthemum pallens Aiton subsp. pallens, present
- Mesembryanthemum pallidum L.Bolus, accepted as Lampranthus dilutus N.E.Br. present
- Mesembryanthemum pallidum N.E.Br. accepted as Conophytum ficiforme (Haw.) N.E.Br. present
- Mesembryanthemum palustre L.Bolus, accepted as Lampranthus glaucus (L.) N.E.Br. indigenous
- Mesembryanthemum papulosum L.f. accepted as Cleretum papulosum (L.f.) L.Bolus subsp. papulosum, present
- Mesembryanthemum parviflorum Jacq. indigenous
- Mesembryanthemum parvipapillatum L.Bolus, accepted as Mesembryanthemum guerichianum Pax, present
- Mesembryanthemum parvipetalum N.E.Br. accepted as Conophytum obcordellum (Haw.) N.E.Br. subsp. obcordellum var. obcordellum, present
- Mesembryanthemum parvulum Schltr. accepted as Cephalophyllum parvulum (Schltr.) H.E.K.Hartmann, present
- Mesembryanthemum paucandrum L.Bolus, accepted as Mesembryanthemum nodiflorum L. present
- Mesembryanthemum paulum (N.E.Br.) L.Bolus, endemic
- Mesembryanthemum pauxillum N.E.Br. accepted as Conophytum minimum (Haw.) N.E.Br. present
- Mesembryanthemum pellitum Friedrich, indigenous
- Mesembryanthemum perlatum Dinter, accepted as Mesembryanthemum guerichianum Pax, present
- Mesembryanthemum perpusillum Haw. accepted as Conophytum minimum (Haw.) N.E.Br. present
- Mesembryanthemum pfeilii Engl. accepted as Mesembryanthemum tetragonum Thunb. present
- Mesembryanthemum pictum N.E.Br. accepted as Conophytum minimum (Haw.) N.E.Br. present
- Mesembryanthemum prasinum (L.Bolus) Klak, endemic
- Mesembryanthemum pseudoausanum Dinter, accepted as Mesembryanthemum tetragonum Thunb. present
- Mesembryanthemum pseudoschlichtianum (S.M.Pierce & Gerbaulet) Klak, indigenous
- Mesembryanthemum puberulum Haw. accepted as Mesembryanthemum aitonis Jacq. indigenous
- Mesembryanthemum pumilum (L.Bolus) Klak, accepted as Mesembryanthemum oubergense (L.Bolus) Klak, endemic
- Mesembryanthemum pungens A.Berger, accepted as Ruschia pungens (A.Berger) H.Jacobsen, indigenous
- Mesembryanthemum purpureoroseum L.Bolus, accepted as Mesembryanthemum guerichianum Pax, present
- Mesembryanthemum purpusii Schwantes, accepted as Conophytum truncatum (Thunb.) N.E.Br. subsp. truncatum var. truncatum, present
- Mesembryanthemum pusillum N.E.Br. accepted as Conophytum minimum (Haw.) N.E.Br. present
- Mesembryanthemum quaesitum N.E.Br. accepted as Conophytum quaesitum (N.E.Br.) N.E.Br. subsp. quaesitum var. quaesitum, present
- Mesembryanthemum quartziticola Klak, endemic
- Mesembryanthemum quinangulatum L.Bolus, accepted as Mesembryanthemum guerichianum Pax, present
- Mesembryanthemum rabiei (L.Bolus) Klak, endemic
- Mesembryanthemum radicans (L.Bolus) Klak, accepted as Mesembryanthemum rhizophorum Klak, endemic
- Mesembryanthemum rapaceum Jacq. endemic
- Mesembryanthemum relaxatum Willd. accepted as Mesembryanthemum pallens Aiton subsp. pallens, present
- Mesembryanthemum reptans Aiton, accepted as Lampranthus reptans (Aiton) N.E.Br. indigenous
- Mesembryanthemum resurgens Kensit, endemic
- Mesembryanthemum rhizophorum Klak, endemic
- Mesembryanthemum rhodanthum L.Bolus, accepted as Mesembryanthemum guerichianum Pax, present
- Mesembryanthemum rubrocinctum Haw. accepted as Carpobrotus acinaciformis (L.) L.Bolus, present
- Mesembryanthemum rubroroseum L.Bolus, accepted as Mesembryanthemum guerichianum Pax, present
- Mesembryanthemum salicornioides Pax, indigenous
- Mesembryanthemum salmoneum Haw. accepted as Mesembryanthemum canaliculatum Haw. indigenous
- Mesembryanthemum salmoneum Salm-Dyck, accepted as Mesembryanthemum canaliculatum Haw. indigenous
- Mesembryanthemum scapigerum Haw. accepted as Bergeranthus scapiger (Haw.) Schwantes, indigenous
- Mesembryanthemum schenkii Schinz, indigenous
- Mesembryanthemum schlichtianum Sond. accepted as Mesembryanthemum arenosum Schinz, indigenous
- Mesembryanthemum scintillans Dinter, accepted as Mesembryanthemum oculatum N.E.Br. indigenous
- Mesembryanthemum sedentiflorum (L.Bolus) L.Bolus, accepted as Mesembryanthemum guerichianum Pax, present
- Mesembryanthemum sedoides Dinter & A.Berger, accepted as Eberlanzia sedoides (Dinter & A.Berger) Schwantes, present
- Mesembryanthemum serotinum (L.Bolus) Klak, indigenous
- Mesembryanthemum serpens L.Bolus, accepted as Lampranthus reptans (Aiton) N.E.Br. indigenous
- Mesembryanthemum serratum L. accepted as Circandra serrata (L.) N.E.Br. present
  - Mesembryanthemum sessiliflorum Aiton var. album Haw. accepted as Mesembryanthemum aitonis Jacq. indigenous
- Mesembryanthemum sinuosum L.Bolus, endemic
- Mesembryanthemum sladenianum L.Bolus, indigenous
- Mesembryanthemum spinuliferum Haw. endemic
- Mesembryanthemum spinuliforme Harv. & Sond. accepted as Mesembryanthemum spinuliferum Haw. indigenous
- Mesembryanthemum splendens L. endemic
  - Mesembryanthemum splendens L. subsp. pentagonum (L.Bolus) Klak, endemic
  - Mesembryanthemum splendens L. subsp. splendens, endemic
- Mesembryanthemum springbokense Klak, endemic
- Mesembryanthemum squamulosum (L.Bolus) L.Bolus, accepted as Mesembryanthemum guerichianum Pax, present
- Mesembryanthemum stenandrum (L.Bolus) L.Bolus, endemic
- Mesembryanthemum stenophyllum L.Bolus, accepted as Marlothistella stenophylla (L.Bolus) S.A.Hammer, present
- Mesembryanthemum stramineum Haw. accepted as Mesembryanthemum noctiflorum L. subsp. stramineum (Haw.) Klak, indigenous
- Mesembryanthemum stratum L.Bolus, accepted as Mesembryanthemum paulum (N.E.Br.) L.Bolus, indigenous
- Mesembryanthemum suaveolens L.Bolus, accepted as Mesembryanthemum lignescens (L.Bolus) Klak, indigenous
- Mesembryanthemum subnodosum A.Berger, indigenous
- Mesembryanthemum subrigidum L.Bolus, accepted as Mesembryanthemum guerichianum Pax, present
- Mesembryanthemum subrisum N.E.Br. accepted as Conophytum pageae (N.E.Br.) N.E.Br. present
- Mesembryanthemum subtereticaule L.Bolus, accepted as Mesembryanthemum guerichianum Pax, present
- Mesembryanthemum subtruncatum L.Bolus, endemic
- Mesembryanthemum suffruticosum (L.Bolus) Klak, endemic
- Mesembryanthemum taylorianum Dinter & Schwantes, accepted as Conophytum taylorianum (Dinter & Schwantes) N.E.Br. subsp. taylorianum, present
- Mesembryanthemum tenuiflorum Jacq. endemic
- Mesembryanthemum teretiusculum Haw. accepted as Calamophyllum teretiusculum (Haw.) Schwantes, present
- Mesembryanthemum tetragonum Thunb. indigenous
- Mesembryanthemum tomentosum Klak, indigenous
- Mesembryanthemum tortuosum L. endemic
- Mesembryanthemum trichotomum Thunb. endemic
- Mesembryanthemum vaginatum Lam. endemic
- Mesembryanthemum vanheerdei (L.Bolus) Klak, endemic
- Mesembryanthemum vanrensburgii (L.Bolus) Klak, endemic
- Mesembryanthemum varians Haw. endemic
- Mesembryanthemum velutinum L.Bolus, accepted as Gibbaeum velutinum (L.Bolus) Schwantes, indigenous
- Mesembryanthemum vespertinum A.Berger, accepted as Bergeranthus vespertinus (A.Berger) Schwantes, indigenous
- Mesembryanthemum vigilans L.Bolus, accepted as Mesembryanthemum longistylum DC. indigenous
- Mesembryanthemum violense L.Bolus, accepted as Mesembryanthemum gariusanum Dinter, present
- Mesembryanthemum viridiflorum Aiton, endemic
- Mesembryanthemum volckameri Haw. accepted as Mesembryanthemum aitonis Jacq. indigenous
- Mesembryanthemum woodburniae L.Bolus, accepted as Lampranthus reptans (Aiton) N.E.Br. indigenous

== Mestoklema ==
Genus Mestoklema:

- Mestoklema albanicum N.E.Br. ex Glen, endemic
- Mestoklema arboriforme (Burch.) N.E.Br. ex Glen, endemic
- Mestoklema copiosum N.E.Br. ex Glen, endemic
- Mestoklema elatum N.E.Br. ex Glen, endemic
- Mestoklema illepidum N.E.Br. ex Glen, endemic
- Mestoklema tuberosum (L.) N.E.Br. ex Glen, endemic
  - Mestoklema tuberosum (L.) N.E.Br. ex Glen var. macrorrhizum (Haw.) N.E.Br. ex Glen, accepted as Mestoklema tuberosum (L.) N.E.Br. ex Glen, present

== Meyerophytum ==
Genus Meyerophytum:

- Meyerophytum globosum (L.Bolus) Ihlenf. endemic
- Meyerophytum meyeri (Schwantes) Schwantes, endemic
- Meyerophytum meyeri (Schwantes) Schwantes var. holgatense L.Bolus, accepted as Meyerophytum meyeri (Schwantes) Schwantes, present

== Micropterum ==
Genus Micropterum:

- Micropterum puberulum (Haw.) Schwantes, accepted as Mesembryanthemum aitonis Jacq. indigenous
- Micropterum sessiliflorum (Aiton) Schwantes var. album (Haw.) H.Jacobsen, accepted as Mesembryanthemum aitonis Jacq. indigenous

== Mitrophyllum ==
Genus Mitrophyllum:

- Mitrophyllum abbreviatum L.Bolus, endemic
- Mitrophyllum clivorum (N.E.Br.) Schwantes, endemic
- Mitrophyllum crassifolium (L.Bolus) G.D.Rowley, accepted as Mitrophyllum grande N.E.Br. present
- Mitrophyllum dissitum (N.E.Br.) Schwantes, endemic
- Mitrophyllum grande N.E.Br. endemic
- Mitrophyllum mitratum (Marloth) Schwantes, endemic
- Mitrophyllum parvifolium (L.Bolus) G.D.Rowley, accepted as Mitrophyllum dissitum (N.E.Br.) Schwantes, present
- Mitrophyllum pillansii N.E.Br. accepted as Mitrophyllum grande N.E.Br. present
- Mitrophyllum roseum L.Bolus, endemic

== Monilaria ==
Genus Monilaria:

- Monilaria chrysoleuca (Schltr.) Schwantes, endemic
  - Monilaria chrysoleuca (Schltr.) Schwantes var. polita (L.Bolus) Ihlenf. & S.Jorg. accepted as Monilaria chrysoleuca (Schltr.) Schwantes, present
- Monilaria globosa (L.Bolus) L.Bolus, accepted as Meyerophytum globosum (L.Bolus) Ihlenf. present
- Monilaria moniliformis (Thunb.) Ihlenf. & S.Jorg. endemic
- Monilaria obconica Ihlenf. & S.Jorg. endemic
- Monilaria pisiformis (Haw.) Schwantes, endemic
- Monilaria scutata (L.Bolus) Schwantes, indigenous
  - Monilaria scutata (L.Bolus) Schwantes subsp. obovata Ihlenf. & S.Jorg. endemic
  - Monilaria scutata (L.Bolus) Schwantes subsp. scutata, endemic

== Mossia ==
Genus Mossia:

- Mossia intervallaris (L.Bolus) N.E.Br. indigenous

== Muiria ==
Genus Muiria:

- Muiria hortenseae N.E.Br. accepted as Gibbaeum hortenseae (N.E.Br.) Thiede & Klak, endemic

== Namaquanthus ==
Genus Namaquanthus:

- Namaquanthus vanheerdii L.Bolus, endemic

== Nananthus ==
Genus Nananthus:

- Nananthus aloides (Haw.) Schwantes, indigenous
  - Nananthus aloides (Haw.) Schwantes var. latus L.Bolus, accepted as Nananthus aloides (Haw.) Schwantes, present
  - Nananthus aloides (Haw.) Schwantes var. striatus (L.Bolus) L.Bolus, accepted as Nananthus vittatus (N.E.Br.) Schwantes, present
- Nananthus broomii (L.Bolus) L.Bolus, accepted as Nananthus vittatus (N.E.Br.) Schwantes, present
- Nananthus gerstneri (L.Bolus) L.Bolus, endemic
- Nananthus margaritiferus L.Bolus, indigenous
- Nananthus pallens (L.Bolus) L.Bolus, endemic
- Nananthus peersii L.Bolus, accepted as Deilanthe peersii (L.Bolus) N.E.Br. present
- Nananthus pole-evansii N.E.Br. endemic
- Nananthus transvaalensis (Rolfe) L.Bolus var. transvaalensis, accepted as Nananthus vittatus (N.E.Br.) Schwantes, present
  - Nananthus transvaalensis (Rolfe) L.Bolus var. latus L.Bolus, accepted as Nananthus vittatus (N.E.Br.) Schwantes, present
- Nananthus vittatus (N.E.Br.) Schwantes, indigenous
- Nananthus wilmaniae (L.Bolus) L.Bolus, accepted as Nananthus aloides (Haw.) Schwantes, present

== Nelia ==
Genus Nelia:

- Nelia meyeri Schwantes, accepted as Nelia pillansii (N.E.Br.) Schwantes, present
- Nelia pillansii (N.E.Br.) Schwantes, endemic
- Nelia robusta Schwantes, accepted as Nelia pillansii (N.E.Br.) Schwantes, present
- Nelia schlechteri Schwantes, endemic

== Neohenricia ==
Genus Neohenricia:

- Neohenricia sibbettii (L.Bolus) L.Bolus, endemic
- Neohenricia spiculata S.A.Hammer, endemic

== Nycteranthus ==
Genus Nycteranthus:

- Nycteranthus abbreviatus (L.Bolus) Schwantes, accepted as Mesembryanthemum lilliputanum Klak, indigenous
- Nycteranthus albertensis (L.Bolus) Schwantes, accepted as Mesembryanthemum oubergense (L.Bolus) Klak, indigenous
- Nycteranthus anguineus (L.Bolus) Schwantes, accepted as Mesembryanthemum oculatum N.E.Br. indigenous
- Nycteranthus arenicolus (L.Bolus) Schwantes, accepted as Mesembryanthemum oculatum N.E.Br. indigenous
- Nycteranthus aureus (Thunb.) Schwantes, accepted as Mesembryanthemum nitidum Haw. indigenous
- Nycteranthus ausanus (Dinter & A.Berger) Schwantes, accepted as Mesembryanthemum tetragonum Thunb. present
- Nycteranthus brevicarpus (L.Bolus) Schwantes, accepted as Mesembryanthemum brevicarpum (L.Bolus) Klak, indigenous
- Nycteranthus canaliculatus (Haw.) Schwantes, accepted as Mesembryanthemum canaliculatum Haw. indigenous
- Nycteranthus carneus (Haw.) Schwantes, accepted as Mesembryanthemum spinuliferum Haw. indigenous
- Nycteranthus caudatus (L.Bolus) Schwantes, accepted as Mesembryanthemum caudatum L.Bolus, indigenous
- Nycteranthus commutatus (A.Berger) Schwantes, accepted as Mesembryanthemum grossum Aiton, indigenous
- Nycteranthus congestus (L.Bolus) Schwantes, accepted as Mesembryanthemum flavidum Klak, indigenous
- Nycteranthus deciduus (L.Bolus) Schwantes, accepted as Mesembryanthemum deciduum (L.Bolus) Klak, indigenous
- Nycteranthus decurvatus (L.Bolus) Schwantes, accepted as Mesembryanthemum decurvatum (L.Bolus) Klak, indigenous
- Nycteranthus defoliatus (Haw.) Schwantes, accepted as Mesembryanthemum noctiflorum L. subsp. defoliatum (Haw.) Klak, indigenous
- Nycteranthus delus (L.Bolus) Schwantes, accepted as Mesembryanthemum delum L.Bolus, indigenous
- Nycteranthus dinteri (L.Bolus) Schwantes, accepted as Mesembryanthemum ligneum (L.Bolus) Klak, indigenous
- Nycteranthus elongatus (L.Bolus) Schwantes, accepted as Mesembryanthemum prasinum (L.Bolus) Klak, indigenous
- Nycteranthus englishiae (L.Bolus) Schwantes, accepted as Mesembryanthemum englishiae L.Bolus, indigenous
- Nycteranthus fragilis (N.E.Br.) Schwantes, accepted as Mesembryanthemum oculatum N.E.Br. indigenous
- Nycteranthus framesii (L.Bolus) Schwantes, accepted as Mesembryanthemum spinuliferum Haw. indigenous
- Nycteranthus geniculiflorus (L.) Schwantes, accepted as Mesembryanthemum geniculiflorum L. indigenous
- Nycteranthus glanduliferus (L.Bolus) Schwantes, accepted as Mesembryanthemum sinuosum L.Bolus, indigenous
- Nycteranthus godmaniae (L.Bolus) Schwantes, accepted as Mesembryanthemum sinuosum L.Bolus, indigenous
- Nycteranthus gratiae (L.Bolus) Schwantes, accepted as Mesembryanthemum grossum Aiton, indigenous
- Nycteranthus grossus (Aiton) Schwantes, accepted as Mesembryanthemum grossum Aiton, indigenous
- Nycteranthus herbertii (N.E.Br.) Schwantes, accepted as Mesembryanthemum lilliputanum Klak, indigenous
- Nycteranthus inaequalis (L.Bolus) Schwantes, accepted as Mesembryanthemum nitidum Haw. indigenous
- Nycteranthus latipetalus (L.Bolus) Schwantes, accepted as Mesembryanthemum latipetalum (L.Bolus) Klak, indigenous
- Nycteranthus laxipetalus (L.Bolus) Schwantes, accepted as Mesembryanthemum grossum Aiton, indigenous
- Nycteranthus laxus (L.Bolus) Schwantes, accepted as Mesembryanthemum decurvatum (L.Bolus) Klak, present
- Nycteranthus ligneus (L.Bolus) Schwantes, accepted as Mesembryanthemum ligneum (L.Bolus) Klak, indigenous
- Nycteranthus longispinulus (Haw.) Schwantes, accepted as Mesembryanthemum grossum Aiton, indigenous
- Nycteranthus longistylus (DC.) Schwantes, accepted as Mesembryanthemum longistylum DC. indigenous
- Nycteranthus longitubus (L.Bolus) Schwantes, accepted as Mesembryanthemum tenuiflorum Jacq. indigenous
- Nycteranthus luteoalbus (L.Bolus) Schwantes, accepted as Mesembryanthemum tetragonum Thunb. indigenous
- Nycteranthus macrosiphon (L.Bolus) Schwantes, accepted as Mesembryanthemum tenuiflorum Jacq. indigenous
- Nycteranthus multiseriatus (L.Bolus) Schwantes, accepted as Mesembryanthemum prasinum (L.Bolus) Klak, indigenous
- Nycteranthus mutans (L.Bolus) Schwantes, accepted as Mesembryanthemum tetragonum Thunb. present
- Nycteranthus noctiflorus (L.) Rothm. accepted as Mesembryanthemum noctiflorum L. subsp. noctiflorum, indigenous
- Nycteranthus obtusus (L.Bolus) Schwantes, accepted as Mesembryanthemum decurvatum (L.Bolus) Klak, present
- Nycteranthus oculatus (N.E.Br.) Schwantes, accepted as Mesembryanthemum oculatum N.E.Br. indigenous
- Nycteranthus oubergensis (L.Bolus) Schwantes, accepted as Mesembryanthemum oubergense (L.Bolus) Klak, indigenous
- Nycteranthus parvisepalus (L.Bolus) Schwantes, accepted as Mesembryanthemum spinuliferum Haw. indigenous
- Nycteranthus pentagonus (L.Bolus) Schwantes, accepted as Mesembryanthemum splendens L. subsp. pentagonum (L.Bolus) Klak, indigenous
- Nycteranthus pentagonus (L.Bolus) Schwantes var. occidentalis (L.Bolus) Schwantes, accepted as Mesembryanthemum splendens L. subsp. pentagonum (L.Bolus) Klak, indigenous
- Nycteranthus platysepalus (L.Bolus) Schwantes, accepted as Mesembryanthemum grossum Aiton, indigenous
- Nycteranthus pomonae (L.Bolus) Schwantes, accepted as Mesembryanthemum oculatum N.E.Br. indigenous
- Nycteranthus prasinus (L.Bolus) Schwantes, accepted as Mesembryanthemum prasinum (L.Bolus) Klak, indigenous
- Nycteranthus pumilus (L.Bolus) Schwantes, accepted as Mesembryanthemum oubergense (L.Bolus) Klak, indigenous
- Nycteranthus quartziticus (L.Bolus) Schwantes, accepted as Mesembryanthemum quartziticola Klak, indigenous
- Nycteranthus quaternus (L.Bolus) Schwantes, accepted as Mesembryanthemum spinuliferum Haw. indigenous
- Nycteranthus rabiei (L.Bolus) Schwantes, accepted as Mesembryanthemum rabiei (L.Bolus) Klak, endemic
- Nycteranthus radicans (L.Bolus) Schwantes, accepted as Mesembryanthemum rhizophorum Klak, indigenous
- Nycteranthus recurvus (L.Bolus) Schwantes, accepted as Mesembryanthemum sinuosum L.Bolus, indigenous
- Nycteranthus rhodandrus (L.Bolus) Schwantes, accepted as Mesembryanthemum nitidum Haw. indigenous
- Nycteranthus salmoneus (Haw.) Schwantes, accepted as Mesembryanthemum canaliculatum Haw. indigenous
- Nycteranthus saturatus (L.Bolus) Schwantes, accepted as Mesembryanthemum baylissii (L.Bolus) Klak, present
- Nycteranthus scintillans (Dinter) Schwantes, accepted as Mesembryanthemum oculatum N.E.Br. indigenous
- Nycteranthus serotinus (L.Bolus) Schwantes, accepted as Mesembryanthemum serotinum (L.Bolus) Klak, indigenous
- Nycteranthus sinuosus (L.Bolus) Schwantes, accepted as Mesembryanthemum sinuosum L.Bolus, indigenous
- Nycteranthus spinuliferus (Haw.) Schwantes, accepted as Mesembryanthemum spinuliferum Haw. indigenous
- Nycteranthus splendens (L.) Schwantes, accepted as Mesembryanthemum splendens L. subsp. splendens, indigenous
- Nycteranthus stramineus (Haw.) Schwantes, accepted as Mesembryanthemum noctiflorum L. subsp. stramineum (Haw.) Klak, indigenous
- Nycteranthus straminicolor (L.Bolus) Schwantes, accepted as Mesembryanthemum sinuosum L.Bolus, indigenous
- Nycteranthus strictus (L.Bolus) Schwantes, accepted as Mesembryanthemum spinuliferum Haw. indigenous
- Nycteranthus suffusus (L.Bolus) Schwantes, accepted as Mesembryanthemum tetragonum Thunb. indigenous
- Nycteranthus tenuiflorus (Jacq.) Schwantes, accepted as Mesembryanthemum tenuiflorum Jacq. indigenous
- Nycteranthus tetragonus (Thunb.) Schwantes, accepted as Mesembryanthemum tetragonum Thunb. indigenous
- Nycteranthus tetramerus (L.Bolus) Schwantes, accepted as Mesembryanthemum trichotomum Thunb. indigenous
  - Nycteranthus tetramerus (L.Bolus) Schwantes var. parviflorus (L.Bolus) Schwantes, accepted as Mesembryanthemum trichotomum Thunb. indigenous
- Nycteranthus trichotomus (Thunb.) Schwantes, accepted as Mesembryanthemum trichotomum Thunb. indigenous
- Nycteranthus varians (L.Bolus) Schwantes, accepted as Mesembryanthemum oculatum N.E.Br. indigenous
- Nycteranthus vespertinus (L.Bolus) Schwantes, accepted as Mesembryanthemum occidentale Klak, indigenous
- Nycteranthus vigilans (L.Bolus) Schwantes, accepted as Mesembryanthemum longistylum DC. indigenous
- Nycteranthus viridiflorus (Aiton) Schwantes, accepted as Mesembryanthemum viridiflorum Aiton, indigenous
- Nycteranthus watermeyeri (L.Bolus) Schwantes, accepted as Mesembryanthemum spinuliferum Haw. indigenous
- Nycteranthus willowmorensis (L.Bolus) Schwantes, accepted as Mesembryanthemum grossum Aiton, indigenous

== Octopoma ==
Genus Octopoma:

- Octopoma abruptum (A.Berger) N.E.Br. endemic
- Octopoma calycinum (L.Bolus) L.Bolus, accepted as Zeuktophyllum calycinum (L.Bolus) H.E.K.Hartmann, present
- Octopoma conjunctum (L.Bolus) L.Bolus, accepted as Octopoma connatum (L.Bolus) L.Bolus, present
- Octopoma connatum (L.Bolus) L.Bolus, endemic
- Octopoma inclusum (L.Bolus) N.E.Br. endemic
- Octopoma octojuge (L.Bolus) N.E.Br. endemic
- Octopoma quadrisepalum (L.Bolus) H.E.K.Hartmann, endemic
- Octopoma rupigenum (L.Bolus) L.Bolus, endemic
- Octopoma subglobosum (L.Bolus) L.Bolus, endemic
- Octopoma tanquanum Klak, accepted as Octopoma nanum (L.Bolus) Klak, present
- Octopoma tetrasepalum (L.Bolus) H.E.K.Hartmann, endemic

== Odontophorus ==
Genus Odontophorus:

- Odontophorus angustifolius L.Bolus, indigenous
  - Odontophorus angustifolius L.Bolus subsp. angustifolius, endemic
  - Odontophorus angustifolius L.Bolus subsp. protoparcoides S.A.Hammer, endemic
- Odontophorus marlothii N.E.Br. endemic
- Odontophorus nanus L.Bolus, endemic
- Odontophorus pusillus S.A.Hammer, endemic

== Oophytum ==
Genus Oophytum:

- Oophytum nanum (Schltr.) L.Bolus, endemic
- Oophytum oviforme (N.E.Br.) N.E.Br. endemic

== Ophthalmophyllum ==
Genus Ophthalmophyllum:

- Ophthalmophyllum australe L.Bolus, accepted as Conophytum caroli Lavis, present
- Ophthalmophyllum dinteri Schwantes ex H.Jacobsen, accepted as Conophytum friedrichiae (Dinter) Schwantes
- Ophthalmophyllum fulleri Lavis, accepted as Conophytum longum N.E.Br. present
- Ophthalmophyllum haramoepense L.Bolus, accepted as Conophytum marginatum Lavis subsp. haramoepense (L.Bolus) S.A.Hammer, present
- Ophthalmophyllum herrei Lavis, accepted as Conophytum longum N.E.Br. present
- Ophthalmophyllum latum Tischer forma latum, accepted as Conophytum maughanii N.E.Br. subsp. latum (Tischer) S.A.Hammer, present
  - Ophthalmophyllum latum Tischer forma rubrum (Tischer) G.D.Rowley, accepted as Conophytum maughanii N.E.Br. subsp. latum (Tischer) S.A.Hammer, present
- Ophthalmophyllum littlewoodii L.Bolus, accepted as Conophytum devium G.D.Rowley subsp. devium, present
- Ophthalmophyllum longitubum L.Bolus, accepted as Conophytum longum N.E.Br. present
- Ophthalmophyllum longum (N.E.Br.) Tischer, accepted as Conophytum longum N.E.Br. present
- Ophthalmophyllum lydiae H.Jacobsen, accepted as Conophytum lydiae (H.Jacobsen) G.D.Rowley, present
- Ophthalmophyllum maughanii (N.E.Br.) Schwantes, accepted as Conophytum maughanii N.E.Br. subsp. maughanii, present
- Ophthalmophyllum noctiflorum L.Bolus, accepted as Conophytum maughanii N.E.Br. subsp. latum (Tischer) S.A.Hammer, present
- Ophthalmophyllum praesectum (N.E.Br.) Schwantes, accepted as Conophytum praesectum N.E.Br. present
- Ophthalmophyllum pubescens Tischer, accepted as Conophytum pubescens (Tischer) G.D.Rowley, present
- Ophthalmophyllum rufescens (N.E.Br.) Tischer, accepted as Conophytum maughanii N.E.Br. subsp. maughanii, present
- Ophthalmophyllum schlechteri Schwantes, accepted as Conophytum longum N.E.Br. present
- Ophthalmophyllum schuldtii Schwantes, accepted as Conophytum maughanii N.E.Br. subsp. maughanii
- Ophthalmophyllum spathulatum L.Bolus, accepted as Conophytum lydiae (H.Jacobsen) G.D.Rowley, present
- Ophthalmophyllum subfenestratum (Schwantes) Tischer, accepted as Conophytum subfenestratum Schwantes, present
- Ophthalmophyllum triebneri Schwantes, accepted as Conophytum friedrichiae (Dinter) Schwantes$
- Ophthalmophyllum vanheerdei L.Bolus, accepted as Conophytum friedrichiae (Dinter) Schwantes, present
- Ophthalmophyllum verrucosum Lavis, accepted as Conophytum verrucosum (Lavis) G.D.Rowley, present
- Ophthalmophyllum villetii L.Bolus, accepted as Conophytum concordans G.D.Rowley, present

== Opophytum ==
Genus Opophytum:

- Opophytum ampliatum L.Bolus, accepted as Mesembryanthemum hypertrophicum Dinter, present
- Opophytum australe L.Bolus, accepted as Mesembryanthemum hypertrophicum Dinter, present
- Opophytum cryptanthum (Hook.f.) Gerbaulet, accepted as Mesembryanthemum cryptanthum Hook.f. indigenous
- Opophytum fastigiatum (Thunb.) N.E.Br. accepted as Mesembryanthemum fastigiatum Thunb. indigenous
- Opophytum hypertrophicum (Dinter) Gerbaulet, accepted as Mesembryanthemum hypertrophicum Dinter, indigenous

== Orthopterum ==
Genus Orthopterum:

- Orthopterum coegana L.Bolus, endemic
- Orthopterum waltoniae L.Bolus, endemic

== Oscularia ==
Genus Oscularia:

- Oscularia alba (L.Bolus) H.E.K.Hartmann, endemic
- Oscularia caulescens (Mill.) Schwantes, endemic
- Oscularia cedarbergensis (L.Bolus) H.E.K.Hartmann, endemic
- Oscularia compressa (L.Bolus) H.E.K.Hartmann, endemic
- Oscularia comptonii (L.Bolus) H.E.K.Hartmann, endemic
- Oscularia copiosa (L.Bolus) H.E.K.Hartmann, endemic
- Oscularia cremnophila Van Jaarsv. Desmet & A.E.van Wyk, endemic
- Oscularia deltoides (L.) Schwantes, endemic
  - Oscularia deltoides (L.) Schwantes var. major (Weston) Schwantes, accepted as Oscularia major (Weston) Schwantes, present
- Oscularia excedens (L.Bolus) H.E.K.Hartmann, endemic
- Oscularia falciformis (Haw.) H.E.K.Hartmann, accepted as Lampranthus falciformis (Haw.) N.E.Br. present
- Oscularia guthriae (L.Bolus) H.E.K.Hartmann, endemic
- Oscularia lunata (Willd.) H.E.K.Hartmann, endemic
- Oscularia major (Weston) Schwantes, endemic
- Oscularia ornata (L.Bolus) H.E.K.Hartmann, endemic
- Oscularia paardebergensis (L.Bolus) H.E.K.Hartmann, endemic
- Oscularia pedunculata (N.E.Br.) Schwantes, endemic
- Oscularia piquetbergensis (L.Bolus) H.E.K.Hartmann, endemic
- Oscularia prasina (L.Bolus) H.E.K.Hartmann, endemic
- Oscularia primiverna (L.Bolus) H.E.K.Hartmann, endemic
- Oscularia steenbergensis (L.Bolus) H.E.K.Hartmann, endemic
- Oscularia superans (L.Bolus) H.E.K.Hartmann, endemic
- Oscularia thermarum (L.Bolus) H.E.K.Hartmann, endemic
- Oscularia vernicolor (L.Bolus) H.E.K.Hartmann, endemic
- Oscularia vredenburgensis (L.Bolus) H.E.K.Hartmann, endemic

== Ottosonderia ==
Genus Ottosonderia:

- Ottosonderia monticola (Sond.) L.Bolus, endemic
- Ottosonderia obtusa L.Bolus, accepted as Ottosonderia monticola (Sond.) L.Bolus, endemic

== Peersia ==
Genus Peersia:

- Peersia frithii (L.Bolus) L.Bolus, endemic
- Peersia macradenia (L.Bolus) L.Bolus, endemic
- Peersia vanheerdei (L.Bolus) H.E.K.Hartmann, endemic

== Pentacoilanthus ==
Genus Pentacoilanthus:

- Pentacoilanthus aitonis (Jacq.) Rappa & Camarrone, accepted as Mesembryanthemum aitonis Jacq. indigenous
- Pentacoilanthus crassicaulis (Haw.) Rappa & Camarrone, accepted as Mesembryanthemum crassicaule Haw. indigenous
- Pentacoilanthus crystallinus (L.) Rappa & Camorrone, accepted as Mesembryanthemum crystallinum L. indigenous
- Pentacoilanthus expansus (L.) Rappa & Camorrone, accepted as Mesembryanthemum expansum L. indigenous
- Pentacoilanthus granulicaulis (Haw.) Rappa & Camarrone, accepted as Mesembryanthemum granulicaule Haw. indigenous
- Pentacoilanthus splendens (L.) Rappa & Camorrone, accepted as Mesembryanthemum splendens L. subsp. splendens, present
- Pentacoilanthus tortuosus (L.) Rappa & Camorrone, accepted as Mesembryanthemum tortuosum L. indigenous

== Perapentacoilanthus ==
Genus Perapentacoilanthus:

- Perapentacoilanthus aitonis (Jacq.) Rappa & Camarrone, accepted as Mesembryanthemum aitonis Jacq. indigenous
- Perapentacoilanthus crystallinus (L.) Rappa & Camorrone, accepted as Mesembryanthemum crystallinum L. indigenous
- Perapentacoilanthus delus (L.Bolus) Rappa & Camarrone, accepted as Mesembryanthemum delum L.Bolus, indigenous
- Perapentacoilanthus fastigiatus (Thunb.) Rappa & Camorrone, accepted as Mesembryanthemum fastigiatum Thunb. indigenous
- Perapentacoilanthus granulicaulis (Haw.) Rappa & Camarrone, accepted as Mesembryanthemum granulicaule Haw. indigenous
- Perapentacoilanthus grossus (Aiton) Rappa & Camarrone, accepted as Mesembryanthemum grossum Aiton, indigenous
- Perapentacoilanthus longispinulus (Haw.) Rappa & Camarrone, accepted as Mesembryanthemum grossum Aiton, indigenous
- Perapentacoilanthus scintillans (Dinter) Rappa & Camorrone, accepted as Mesembryanthemum oculatum N.E.Br. indigenous
- Perapentacoilanthus spinuliferus (Haw.) Rappa & Camarrone, accepted as Mesembryanthemum spinuliferum Haw. indigenous
- Perapentacoilanthus vanrensburgii (L.Bolus) Rappa & Camarrone, accepted as Mesembryanthemum vanrensburgii (L.Bolus) Klak, indigenous
- Perapentacoilanthus viridiflorus (Aiton) Rappa & Camarrone, accepted as Mesembryanthemum viridiflorum Aiton, indigenous

== Peratetracoilanthus ==
Genus Peratetracoilanthus:

- Peratetracoilanthus defoliatus (Haw.) Rappa & Camarrone, accepted as Mesembryanthemum noctiflorum L. subsp. defoliatum (Haw.) Klak, indigenous
- Peratetracoilanthus geniculiflorus (L.) Rappa & Camorrone, accepted as Mesembryanthemum geniculiflorum L. indigenous
- Peratetracoilanthus haeckelianus (A.Berger) Rappa & Camarrone, accepted as Mesembryanthemum haeckelianum A.Berger, indigenous
- Peratetracoilanthus junceus (Haw.) Rappa & Camarrone, accepted as Mesembryanthemum junceum Haw. indigenous
- Peratetracoilanthus noctiflorus (L.) Rappa & Camorrone, accepted as Mesembryanthemum noctiflorum L. subsp. noctiflorum, indigenous
- Peratetracoilanthus parviflorus (Jacq.) Rappa & Camarrone, accepted as Mesembryanthemum parviflorum Jacq. indigenous
- Peratetracoilanthus tetragonus (Thunb.) Rappa & Camorrone, accepted as Mesembryanthemum tetragonum Thunb. indigenous

== Phiambolia ==
Genus Phiambolia:

- Phiambolia franciscii (L.Bolus) Klak, endemic
- Phiambolia gydouwensis (L.Bolus) Klak, endemic
- Phiambolia hallii (L.Bolus) Klak, endemic
- Phiambolia incumbens (L.Bolus) Klak, endemic
- Phiambolia littlewoodii (L.Bolus) Klak, endemic
- Phiambolia longifolia Klak, endemic
- Phiambolia mentiens Klak, endemic
- Phiambolia persistens (L.Bolus) Klak, endemic
- Phiambolia similis Klak, endemic
- Phiambolia stayneri (L.Bolus ex Toelken & Jessop) Klak, accepted as Phiambolia littlewoodii (L.Bolus) Klak, endemic
- Phiambolia unca (L.Bolus) Klak, endemic

== Phyllobolus ==
Genus Phyllobolus:

- Phyllobolus abbreviatus (L.Bolus) Gerbaulet, accepted as Mesembryanthemum lilliputanum Klak, endemic
- Phyllobolus amabilis Gerbaulet & Struck, accepted as Mesembryanthemum amabile (Gerbaulet & Struck) Klak, endemic
- Phyllobolus bulletrapensis (Klak) Gerbaulet, accepted as Mesembryanthemum bulletrapense Klak, endemic
- Phyllobolus canaliculatus (Haw.) Bittrich, accepted as Mesembryanthemum canaliculatum Haw. endemic
- Phyllobolus caudatus (L.Bolus) Gerbaulet, accepted as Mesembryanthemum caudatum L.Bolus, endemic
- Phyllobolus chrysophthalmus Gerbaulet & Struck, accepted as Mesembryanthemum chrysophthalmum (Gerbaulet & Struck) Klak, endemic
- Phyllobolus congestus (L.Bolus) Gerbaulet, accepted as Mesembryanthemum flavidum Klak, endemic
- Phyllobolus deciduus (L.Bolus) Gerbaulet, accepted as Mesembryanthemum deciduum (L.Bolus) Klak, endemic
- Phyllobolus decurvatus (L.Bolus) Gerbaulet, accepted as Mesembryanthemum decurvatum (L.Bolus) Klak, endemic
- Phyllobolus delus (L.Bolus) Gerbaulet, accepted as Mesembryanthemum delum L.Bolus, endemic
- Phyllobolus digitatus (Aiton) Gerbaulet, accepted as Mesembryanthemum digitatum Aiton subsp. digitatum, indigenous
- Phyllobolus digitatus (Aiton) Gerbaulet subsp. littlewoodii (L.Bolus) Gerbaulet, accepted as Mesembryanthemum digitatum Aiton subsp. littlewoodii (L.Bolus) Klak, indigenous
- Phyllobolus gariepensis Gerbaulet & Struck, accepted as Mesembryanthemum gariepense (Gerbaulet & Struck) Klak, endemic
- Phyllobolus grossus (Aiton) Gerbaulet, accepted as Mesembryanthemum grossum Aiton, endemic
- Phyllobolus herbertii (N.E.Br.) Gerbaulet, accepted as Mesembryanthemum lilliputanum Klak, endemic
- Phyllobolus humilis (L.Bolus) Klak, accepted as Mesembryanthemum holense Klak, endemic
- Phyllobolus latipetalus (L.Bolus) Gerbaulet, accepted as Mesembryanthemum latipetalum (L.Bolus) Klak, endemic
- Phyllobolus lesliei N.E.Br. accepted as Mesembryanthemum resurgens Kensit, indigenous
- Phyllobolus lignescens (L.Bolus) Gerbaulet, accepted as Mesembryanthemum lignescens (L.Bolus) Klak, indigenous
- Phyllobolus melanospermus (Dinter & Schwantes) Gerbaulet, accepted as Mesembryanthemum ligneum (L.Bolus) Klak, indigenous
- Phyllobolus nitidus (Haw.) Gerbaulet, accepted as Mesembryanthemum nitidum Haw. endemic
- Phyllobolus noctiflorus (L.) Bittrich, accepted as Mesembryanthemum noctiflorum L. subsp. noctiflorum, indigenous
- Phyllobolus oculatus (N.E.Br.) Gerbaulet, accepted as Mesembryanthemum oculatum N.E.Br. indigenous
- Phyllobolus pallens (Aiton) Bittrich, accepted as Mesembryanthemum pallens Aiton subsp. pallens, indigenous
- Phyllobolus pearsonii N.E.Br. ex S.A.Hammer, accepted as Mesembryanthemum resurgens Kensit, indigenous
- Phyllobolus prasinus (L.Bolus) Gerbaulet, accepted as Mesembryanthemum prasinum (L.Bolus) Klak, endemic
- Phyllobolus publicalyx N.E.Br. accepted as Mesembryanthemum resurgens Kensit, indigenous
- Phyllobolus pumilus (L.Bolus) Gerbaulet, accepted as Mesembryanthemum oubergense (L.Bolus) Klak, endemic
- Phyllobolus quartziticus (L.Bolus) Gerbaulet, accepted as Mesembryanthemum quartziticola Klak, endemic
- Phyllobolus rabiei (L.Bolus) Gerbaulet, accepted as Mesembryanthemum rabiei (L.Bolus) Klak, endemic
- Phyllobolus resurgens (Kensit) Schwantes, accepted as Mesembryanthemum resurgens Kensit, endemic
- Phyllobolus roseus (L.Bolus) Gerbaulet, accepted as Mesembryanthemum vanheerdei (L.Bolus) Klak, endemic
- Phyllobolus saturatus (L.Bolus) Gerbaulet, accepted as Mesembryanthemum baylissii (L.Bolus) Klak, endemic
- Phyllobolus sinuosus (L.Bolus) Gerbaulet, accepted as Mesembryanthemum sinuosum L.Bolus, endemic
- Phyllobolus spinuliferus (Haw.) Gerbaulet, accepted as Mesembryanthemum spinuliferum Haw. endemic
- Phyllobolus splendens (L.) Gerbaulet, accepted as Mesembryanthemum splendens L. subsp. splendens, indigenous
  - Phyllobolus splendens (L.) Gerbaulet subsp. pentagonus (L.Bolus) Gerbaulet, accepted as Mesembryanthemum splendens L. subsp. pentagonum (L.Bolus) Klak, endemic
- Phyllobolus suffruticosus (L.Bolus) Gerbaulet, accepted as Mesembryanthemum suffruticosum (L.Bolus) Klak, endemic
- Phyllobolus tenuiflorus (Jacq.) Gerbaulet, accepted as Mesembryanthemum tenuiflorum Jacq. endemic
- Phyllobolus tortuosus (L.) Bittrich, accepted as Mesembryanthemum tortuosum L. indigenous
- Phyllobolus trichotomus (Thunb.) Gerbaulet, accepted as Mesembryanthemum trichotomum Thunb. endemic
- Phyllobolus viridiflorus (Aiton) Gerbaulet, accepted as Mesembryanthemum viridiflorum Aiton, endemic

== Platythyra ==
Genus Platythyra:

- Platythyra barklyi (N.E.Br.) Schwantes, accepted as Mesembryanthemum barklyi N.E.Br. indigenous
- Platythyra haeckeliana (A.Berger) N.E.Br. accepted as Mesembryanthemum haeckelianum A.Berger, indigenous
- Platythyra pallens (Aiton) L.Bolus, accepted as Mesembryanthemum pallens Aiton subsp. pallens, indigenous
- Platythyra relaxata (Willd.) Schwantes, accepted as Mesembryanthemum pallens Aiton subsp. pallens, present

== Pleiospilos ==
Genus Pleiospilos:

- Pleiospilos bolusii (Hook.f.) N.E.Br. endemic
- Pleiospilos compactus (Aiton) Schwantes, indigenous
  - Pleiospilos compactus (Aiton) Schwantes subsp. canus (Haw.) H.E.K.Hartmann & Liede, endemic
  - Pleiospilos compactus (Aiton) Schwantes subsp. compactus, endemic
  - Pleiospilos compactus (Aiton) Schwantes subsp. fergusoniae (L.Bolus) H.E.K.Hartmann & Liede, endemic
  - Pleiospilos compactus (Aiton) Schwantes subsp. minor (L.Bolus) H.E.K.Hartmann & Liede, endemic
  - Pleiospilos compactus (Aiton) Schwantes subsp. sororius (N.E.Br.) H.E.K.Hartmann & Liede, endemic
- Pleiospilos nelii Schwantes, endemic
- Pleiospilos simulans (Marloth) N.E.Br. endemic

== Plinthus ==
Genus Plinthus:

- Plinthus arenarius Adamson, indigenous
- Plinthus cryptocarpus Fenzl, indigenous
- Plinthus karooicus I.Verd. indigenous
- Plinthus rehmannii G.Schellenb. endemic
- Plinthus sericeus Pax, indigenous

== Polymita ==
Genus Polymita:

- Polymita albiflora (L.Bolus) L.Bolus, endemic
- Polymita diutina (L.Bolus) L.Bolus, accepted as Polymita albiflora (L.Bolus) L.Bolus, present
- Polymita steenbokensis H.E.K.Hartmann, endemic

== Prenia ==
Genus Prenia:

- Prenia englishiae (L.Bolus) Gerbaulet, accepted as Mesembryanthemum englishiae L.Bolus, endemic
- Prenia olivacea (Schltr.) H.Jacobsen, accepted as Mesembryanthemum tenuiflorum Jacq. indigenous
- Prenia pallens (Aiton) N.E.Br. accepted as Mesembryanthemum pallens Aiton subsp. pallens, indigenous
  - Prenia pallens (Aiton) N.E.Br. subsp. lancea (Thunb.) Gerbaulet, accepted as Mesembryanthemum pallens Aiton subsp. lanceum (Thunb.) Klak, endemic
  - Prenia pallens (Aiton) N.E.Br. subsp. namaquensis Gerbaulet, accepted as Mesembryanthemum pallens Aiton subsp. namaquense (Gerbaulet) Klak, endemic
  - Prenia pallens (Aiton) N.E.Br. var. lutea L.Bolus, accepted as Mesembryanthemum pallens Aiton subsp. luteum (L.Bolus) Klak, endemic
- Prenia radicans (L.Bolus) Gerbaulet, accepted as Mesembryanthemum rhizophorum Klak, endemic
- Prenia relaxata (Willd.) N.E.Br. accepted as Mesembryanthemum pallens Aiton subsp. pallens, present
- Prenia sladeniana (L.Bolus) L.Bolus, accepted as Mesembryanthemum sladenianum L.Bolus, indigenous
- Prenia tetragona (Thunb.) Gerbaulet, accepted as Mesembryanthemum tetragonum Thunb. indigenous
- Prenia vanrensburgii L.Bolus, accepted as Mesembryanthemum vanrensburgii (L.Bolus) Klak, endemic

== Prepodesma ==
Genus Prepodesma:

- Prepodesma orpenii (N.E.Br.) N.E.Br. endemic

== Psammophora ==
Genus Psammophora:

- Psammophora herrei L.Bolus, accepted as Psammophora longifolia L.Bolus
- Psammophora longifolia L.Bolus, indigenous
- Psammophora modesta (Dinter & A.Berger) Dinter & Schwantes, indigenous

== Pseudobrownanthus ==
Genus Pseudobrownanthus:

- Pseudobrownanthus nucifer Ihlenf. & Bittrich, accepted as Mesembryanthemum nucifer (Ihlenf. & Bittrich) Klak, indigenous

== Psilocaulon ==
Genus Psilocaulon:

- Psilocaulon absimile N.E.Br. accepted as Mesembryanthemum coriarium Burch. ex N.E.Br. present
- Psilocaulon acutisepalum (A.Berger) N.E.Br. accepted as Mesembryanthemum junceum Haw. present
- Psilocaulon album L.Bolus, accepted as Mesembryanthemum leptarthron A.Berger, present
- Psilocaulon annuum L.Bolus, accepted as Mesembryanthemum articulatum Thunb. present
- Psilocaulon arenosum (Schinz) L.Bolus, accepted as Mesembryanthemum arenosum Schinz, indigenous
- Psilocaulon articulatum (Thunb.) N.E.Br. accepted as Mesembryanthemum articulatum Thunb. indigenous
- Psilocaulon baylissii L.Bolus, accepted as Mesembryanthemum dinteri Engl. present
- Psilocaulon bicorne (Sond.) Schwantes, accepted as Mesembryanthemum bicorne Sond. endemic
- Psilocaulon bryantii L.Bolus, accepted as Mesembryanthemum articulatum Thunb. present
- Psilocaulon calvinianum L.Bolus, accepted as Mesembryanthemum junceum Haw. present
- Psilocaulon candidum L.Bolus, accepted as Mesembryanthemum junceum Haw. present
- Psilocaulon clavulatum (A.Berger) N.E.Br. accepted as Mesembryanthemum subnodosum A.Berger
- Psilocaulon corallinum (Thunb.) Schwantes, accepted as Mesembryanthemum corallinum Thunb. indigenous
- Psilocaulon coriarium (Burch. ex N.E.Br.) N.E.Br. accepted as Mesembryanthemum coriarium Burch. ex N.E.Br. indigenous
- Psilocaulon dejagerae L.Bolus, accepted as Mesembryanthemum articulatum Thunb. present
- Psilocaulon delosepalum L.Bolus, accepted as Mesembryanthemum junceum Haw. present
- Psilocaulon densum N.E.Br. endemic
- Psilocaulon dinteri (Engl.) Schwantes, accepted as Mesembryanthemum dinteri Engl. indigenous
- Psilocaulon duthiae L.Bolus, accepted as Mesembryanthemum articulatum Thunb. present
- Psilocaulon filipetalum L.Bolus, accepted as Mesembryanthemum subnodosum A.Berger, present
- Psilocaulon fimbriatum L.Bolus, accepted as Mesembryanthemum salicornioides Pax
- Psilocaulon foliosum L.Bolus, accepted as Mesembryanthemum neofoliosum Klak, endemic
- Psilocaulon framesii L.Bolus, accepted as Mesembryanthemum junceum Haw. present
- Psilocaulon glareosum (A.Berger) Dinter & Schwantes, accepted as Mesembryanthemum salicornioides Pax, present
- Psilocaulon godmaniae L.Bolus, accepted as Mesembryanthemum dinteri Engl. indigenous
  - Psilocaulon godmaniae L.Bolus var. gracile L.Bolus, accepted as Mesembryanthemum dinteri Engl. present
- Psilocaulon granulicaule (Haw.) Schwantes, accepted as Mesembryanthemum granulicaule Haw. indigenous
- Psilocaulon herrei L.Bolus, accepted as Mesembryanthemum dinteri Engl. present
- Psilocaulon hirtellum L.Bolus, accepted as Mesembryanthemum articulatum Thunb. present
- Psilocaulon imitans L.Bolus, accepted as Mesembryanthemum junceum Haw. present
- Psilocaulon implexum N.E.Br. accepted as Mesembryanthemum parviflorum Jacq. present
- Psilocaulon inconstrictum L.Bolus, accepted as Mesembryanthemum subnodosum A.Berger, present
- Psilocaulon junceum (Haw.) Schwantes, accepted as Mesembryanthemum junceum Haw. endemic
- Psilocaulon laxiflorum L.Bolus, accepted as Mesembryanthemum junceum Haw. present
- Psilocaulon leightoniae L.Bolus, accepted as Mesembryanthemum junceum Haw. present
- Psilocaulon leptarthron (A.Berger) N.E.Br. accepted as Mesembryanthemum leptarthron A.Berger, endemic
- Psilocaulon levynsiae N.E.Br. accepted as Mesembryanthemum junceum Haw. present
- Psilocaulon lewisiae L.Bolus, accepted as Mesembryanthemum junceum Haw. present
- Psilocaulon liebenbergii L.Bolus, accepted as Mesembryanthemum articulatum Thunb. present
- Psilocaulon lindequistii (Engl.) Schwantes, accepted as Mesembryanthemum noctiflorum L. subsp. noctiflorum
- Psilocaulon littlewoodii L.Bolus, accepted as Mesembryanthemum dinteri Engl. present
- Psilocaulon longipes L.Bolus, accepted as Mesembryanthemum rapaceum Jacq. present
- Psilocaulon marlothii (Pax) Friedrich, accepted as Mesembryanthemum marlothii Pax, indigenous
- Psilocaulon melanospermum (A.Berger) N.E.Br. accepted as Mesembryanthemum geniculiflorum L. indigenous
- Psilocaulon mentiens (A.Berger) N.E.Br. accepted as Mesembryanthemum coriarium Burch. ex N.E.Br. present
- Psilocaulon mucronulatum (Dinter) N.E.Br. accepted as Mesembryanthemum articulatum Thunb. present
- Psilocaulon oculatum L.Bolus, accepted as Mesembryanthemum junceum Haw. present
- Psilocaulon pageae L.Bolus, accepted as Mesembryanthemum dinteri Engl. indigenous
  - Psilocaulon pageae L.Bolus var. grandiflorum L.Bolus, accepted as Mesembryanthemum dinteri Engl. present
- Psilocaulon parviflorum (Jacq.) Schwantes, accepted as Mesembryanthemum parviflorum Jacq. indigenous
- Psilocaulon pauper L.Bolus, accepted as Mesembryanthemum granulicaule Haw. present
- Psilocaulon peersii L.Bolus, accepted as Mesembryanthemum corallinum Thunb. present
- Psilocaulon pfeilii (Engl.) Schwantes, accepted as Mesembryanthemum tetragonum Thunb. present
- Psilocaulon planisepalum L.Bolus, accepted as Mesembryanthemum junceum Haw. present
- Psilocaulon pomeridianum L.Bolus, accepted as Mesembryanthemum stenandrum (L.Bolus) L.Bolus, present
- Psilocaulon rapaceum (Jacq.) Schwantes, accepted as Mesembryanthemum rapaceum Jacq. indigenous
- Psilocaulon rogersiae L.Bolus, accepted as Mesembryanthemum junceum Haw. present
- Psilocaulon roseoalbum L.Bolus, accepted as Mesembryanthemum articulatum Thunb. present
- Psilocaulon salicornioides (Pax) Schwantes, accepted as Mesembryanthemum salicornioides Pax, indigenous
- Psilocaulon schlichtianum (Sond.) Schwantes, accepted as Mesembryanthemum arenosum Schinz, indigenous
- Psilocaulon semilunatum L.Bolus, accepted as Mesembryanthemum junceum Haw. present
- Psilocaulon simile (Sond.) Schwantes, accepted as Mesembryanthemum junceum Haw. present
- Psilocaulon stayneri L.Bolus, accepted as Mesembryanthemum junceum Haw. present
- Psilocaulon subintegrum L.Bolus, accepted as Mesembryanthemum junceum Haw. present
- Psilocaulon subnodosum (A.Berger) N.E.Br. accepted as Mesembryanthemum subnodosum A.Berger, indigenous
- Psilocaulon tenue (Haw.) Schwantes, accepted as Mesembryanthemum parviflorum Jacq. present
- Psilocaulon uncinatum L.Bolus, accepted as Mesembryanthemum coriarium Burch. ex N.E.Br.
- Psilocaulon utile L.Bolus, accepted as Mesembryanthemum junceum Haw. present
- Psilocaulon variabile L.Bolus, accepted as Mesembryanthemum dinteri Engl. present

== Pteropentacoilanthus ==
Genus Pteropentacoilanthus:

- Pteropentacoilanthus fastigiatus (Dinter) Rappa & Camorrone, accepted as Mesembryanthemum fastigiatum Thunb. indigenous
- Pteropentacoilanthus hypertrophicus (Dinter) Rappa & Camorrone, accepted as Mesembryanthemum hypertrophicum Dinter, indigenous

== Rabiea ==
Genus Rabiea:

- Rabiea albinota (Haw.) N.E.Br. indigenous
  - Rabiea albinota (Haw.) N.E.Br. var. longipetala L.Bolus, accepted as Rabiea albinota (Haw.) N.E.Br. present
  - Rabiea albinota (Haw.) N.E.Br. var. microstigma L.Bolus, accepted as Rabiea albinota (Haw.) N.E.Br. present
- Rabiea albipuncta (Haw.) N.E.Br. endemic
  - Rabiea albipuncta (Haw.) N.E.Br. var. major L.Bolus, accepted as Rabiea albipuncta (Haw.) N.E.Br. present
- Rabiea comptonii (L.Bolus) L.Bolus, endemic
- Rabiea difformis (L.Bolus) L.Bolus, endemic
- Rabiea jamesii (L.Bolus) L.Bolus, endemic
- Rabiea lesliei N.E.Br. indigenous
- Rabiea tersa N.E.Br. accepted as Prepodesma orpenii (N.E.Br.) N.E.Br. present

== Rhinephyllum ==
Genus Rhinephyllum:

- Rhinephyllum broomii L.Bolus, endemic
- Rhinephyllum comptonii L.Bolus, endemic
- Rhinephyllum frithii (L.Bolus) L.Bolus, accepted as Peersia frithii (L.Bolus) L.Bolus, present
- Rhinephyllum graniforme (Haw.) L.Bolus, endemic
- Rhinephyllum inaequale L.Bolus, endemic
  - Rhinephyllum inaequale L.Bolus var. latipetalum L.Bolus, accepted as Rhinephyllum inaequale L.Bolus, present
- Rhinephyllum luteum (L.Bolus) L.Bolus, endemic
- Rhinephyllum macradenium (L.Bolus) L.Bolus, accepted as Peersia macradenia (L.Bolus) L.Bolus, present
- Rhinephyllum muirii N.E.Br. endemic
- Rhinephyllum obliquum L.Bolus, endemic
- Rhinephyllum parvifolium L.Bolus, endemic
- Rhinephyllum pillansii N.E.Br. endemic
- Rhinephyllum rouxii (L.Bolus) L.Bolus, accepted as Chasmatophyllum rouxii L.Bolus, present
- Rhinephyllum schonlandii L.Bolus, endemic
- Rhinephyllum vanheerdei L.Bolus, accepted as Peersia vanheerdei (L.Bolus) H.E.K.Hartmann, present

== Rhombophyllum ==
Genus Rhombophyllum:

- Rhombophyllum albanense (L.Bolus) H.E.K.Hartmann, endemic
- Rhombophyllum dolabriforme (L.) Schwantes, endemic
- Rhombophyllum dyeri (L.Bolus) H.E.K.Hartmann, endemic
- Rhombophyllum nelii Schwantes, endemic
- Rhombophyllum rhomboideum (Salm-Dyck) Schwantes, endemic
  - Rhombophyllum rhomboideum (Salm-Dyck) Schwantes var. groppiorum Heinrich, accepted as Rhombophyllum rhomboideum (Salm-Dyck) Schwantes, present

== Roosia ==
Genus Roosia:

- Roosia grahambeckii (Van Jaarsv.) Van Jaarsv. endemic
- Roosia lucilleae (Van Jaarsv.) Van Jaarsv. endemic

== Ruschia ==
Genus Ruschia:

- Ruschia abbreviata L.Bolus, indigenous
- Ruschia acocksii L.Bolus, endemic
- Ruschia acuminata L.Bolus, endemic
- Ruschia acutangula (Haw.) Schwantes, endemic
- Ruschia addita L.Bolus, accepted as Antimima addita (L.Bolus) H.E.K.Hartmann, present
- Ruschia aggregata L.Bolus, endemic
- Ruschia alata L.Bolus, endemic
- Ruschia albertensis L.Bolus, accepted as Ruschia spinosa (L.) Dehn, present
- Ruschia albida Klak, endemic
- Ruschia alborubra L.Bolus, accepted as Antimima alborubra (L.Bolus) Dehn, present
- Ruschia altigena (L.Bolus) L.Bolus, endemic
- Ruschia amicorum (L.Bolus) Schwantes, endemic
- Ruschia amoena Schwantes, accepted as Antimima amoena (Schwantes) H.E.K.Hartmann, present
- Ruschia ampliata L.Bolus, endemic
- Ruschia androsacea Marloth & Schwantes, accepted as Antimima androsacea (Marloth & Schwantes) H.E.K.Hartmann, present
- Ruschia approximata (L.Bolus) Schwantes, endemic
- Ruschia archeri L.Bolus, endemic
  - Ruschia archeri L.Bolus var. sexpartita L.Bolus, accepted as Ruschia archeri L.Bolus, present
- Ruschia arenosa L.Bolus, accepted as Ruschiella lunulata (A.Berger) Klak, present
- Ruschia aristata L.Bolus, accepted as Erepsia aristata (L.Bolus) Liede & H.E.K.Hartmann, present
- Ruschia aristulata (Sond.) Schwantes, accepted as Antimima aristulata (Sond.) Chess. & Gideon F.Sm. indigenous
- Ruschia armata L.Bolus, accepted as Arenifera stylosa (L.Bolus) H.E.K.Hartmann, present
- Ruschia aspera L.Bolus, endemic
- Ruschia atrata L.Bolus, endemic
- Ruschia barnardii L.Bolus, indigenous
- Ruschia beaufortensis L.Bolus, endemic
- Ruschia bicolorata L.Bolus, accepted as Stoeberia beetzii (Dinter) Dinter & Schwantes, present
- Ruschia biformis (N.E.Br.) Schwantes, accepted as Antimima biformis (N.E.Br.) H.E.K.Hartmann, present
- Ruschia bijliae L.Bolus, endemic
- Ruschia bina L.Bolus, accepted as Antimima viatorum (L.Bolus) Klak, present
- Ruschia bipapillata L.Bolus, endemic
- Ruschia bolusiae Schwantes, endemic
- Ruschia bracteata L.Bolus, accepted as Antimima bracteata (L.Bolus) H.E.K.Hartmann, present
- Ruschia brakdamensis (L.Bolus) L.Bolus, endemic
- Ruschia breekpoortensis L.Bolus, endemic
- Ruschia brevibracteata L.Bolus, endemic
- Ruschia brevicarpa L.Bolus, accepted as Antimima brevicarpa (L.Bolus) H.E.K.Hartmann, present
- Ruschia brevicollis (N.E.Br.) Schwantes, accepted as Antimima brevicollis (N.E.Br.) H.E.K.Hartmann, present
- Ruschia brevicyma L.Bolus, endemic
- Ruschia brevifolia L.Bolus, endemic
- Ruschia brevipes L.Bolus, endemic
  - Ruschia brevipes L.Bolus var. gracilis L.Bolus, accepted as Ruschia brevipes L.Bolus, present
- Ruschia britteniae L.Bolus, endemic
- Ruschia burtoniae L.Bolus, endemic
- Ruschia calcarea L.Bolus, endemic
- Ruschia calcicola (L.Bolus) L.Bolus, endemic
- Ruschia callifera L.Bolus, endemic
- Ruschia campestris (Burch.) Schwantes, endemic
- Ruschia canonotata (L.Bolus) Schwantes, indigenous
- Ruschia capornii (L.Bolus) L.Bolus, endemic
- Ruschia caroli (L.Bolus) Schwantes, endemic
- Ruschia caudata L.Bolus, accepted as Ruschia tumidula (Haw.) Schwantes, endemic
- Ruschia cedarbergensis L.Bolus, endemic
- Ruschia centrocapsula H.E.K.Hartmann & Stuber, endemic
- Ruschia ceresiana L.Bolus, endemic
- Ruschia ceresiana Schwantes, accepted as Ruschia ceresiana L.Bolus, present
- Ruschia cincta (L.Bolus) L.Bolus, endemic
- Ruschia clavata L.Bolus, endemic
- Ruschia cleista L.Bolus, accepted as Eberlanzia sedoides (Dinter & A.Berger) Schwantes, present
- Ruschia compacta L.Bolus, accepted as Antimima compacta (L.Bolus) H.E.K.Hartmann, present
- Ruschia complanata L.Bolus, endemic
- Ruschia compressa L.Bolus, accepted as Antimima compressa (L.Bolus) H.E.K.Hartmann, present
- Ruschia concava L.Bolus, accepted as Antimima dasyphylla (Schltr.) H.E.K.Hartmann, present
- Ruschia concinna L.Bolus, accepted as Antimima aristulata (Sond.) Chess. & Gideon F.Sm. indigenous
- Ruschia condensa (N.E.Br.) Schwantes, accepted as Antimima condensa (N.E.Br.) H.E.K.Hartmann, present
- Ruschia congesta (Salm-Dyck) L.Bolus, endemic
- Ruschia copiosa L.Bolus, endemic
- Ruschia coriaria (Burch. ex N.E.Br.) Schwantes, accepted as Mesembryanthemum coriarium Burch. ex N.E.Br. indigenous
- Ruschia costata L.Bolus, endemic
- Ruschia cradockensis (Kuntze) H.E.K.Hartmann & Stuber, indigenous
  - Ruschia cradockensis (Kuntze) H.E.K.Hartmann & Stuber subsp. cradockensis, endemic
  - Ruschia cradockensis (Kuntze) H.E.K.Hartmann & Stuber subsp. triticiformis (L.Bolus) H.E.K.Hartmann, indigenous
- Ruschia crassa (L.Bolus) Schwantes, endemic
- Ruschia crassifolia L.Bolus, accepted as Antimima paripetala (L.Bolus) Klak, present
- Ruschia crassisepala L.Bolus, endemic
  - Ruschia crassisepala L.Bolus var. major L.Bolus, accepted as Ruschia crassisepala L.Bolus, present
- Ruschia crassuloides L.Bolus, accepted as Eberlanzia sedoides (Dinter & A.Berger) Schwantes, present
- Ruschia cupulata (L.Bolus) Schwantes, endemic
- Ruschia curta (Haw.) Schwantes, endemic
- Ruschia cyathiformis L.Bolus, accepted as Eberlanzia cyathiformis (L.Bolus) H.E.K.Hartmann, present
- Ruschia cymbifolia (Haw.) L.Bolus, endemic
- Ruschia cymosa (L.Bolus) Schwantes, accepted as Ruschia pungens (A.Berger) H.Jacobsen, endemic
- Ruschia dasyphylla (Schltr.) Schwantes, accepted as Antimima dasyphylla (Schltr.) H.E.K.Hartmann, present
- Ruschia decumbens L.Bolus, endemic
- Ruschia decurrens L.Bolus, endemic
- Ruschia decurvans L.Bolus, endemic
- Ruschia deflecta L.Bolus, accepted as Antimima defecta (L.Bolus) H.E.K.Hartmann, present
- Ruschia dejagerae L.Bolus, endemic
- Ruschia dekenahii (N.E.Br.) Schwantes, accepted as Antimima dekenahi (N.E.Br.) H.E.K.Hartmann, present
- Ruschia densiflora L.Bolus, endemic
- Ruschia depressa L.Bolus, endemic
- Ruschia dichotoma L.Bolus, accepted as Eberlanzia dichotoma (L.Bolus) H.E.K.Hartmann, present
- Ruschia dichroa (Rolfe) L.Bolus, endemic
  - Ruschia dichroa (Rolfe) L.Bolus var. alba L.Bolus, accepted as Ruschia dichroa (Rolfe) L.Bolus, present
- Ruschia dilatata L.Bolus, endemic
- Ruschia distans (L.Bolus) L.Bolus, accepted as Antimima distans (L.Bolus) H.E.K.Hartmann, present
- Ruschia divaricata L.Bolus, indigenous
- Ruschia diversifolia L.Bolus, endemic
- Ruschia dolomitica (Dinter) Dinter & Schwantes, accepted as Antimima dolomitica (Dinter) H.E.K.Hartmann, present
- Ruschia drepanophylla (Schltr. & A.Berger) L.Bolus var. drepanophylla, accepted as Esterhuysenia drepanophylla (Schltr. & A.Berger) H.E.K.Hartmann, present
- Ruschia drepanophylla (Schltr. & A.Berger) L.Bolus var. sneeubergensis L.Bolus, accepted as Esterhuysenia drepanophylla (Schltr. & A.Berger) H.E.K.Hartmann, present
- Ruschia dualis (N.E.Br.) L.Bolus, accepted as Antimima dualis (N.E.Br.) N.E.Br. present
- Ruschia dubitans (L.Bolus) L.Bolus, accepted as Phiambolia unca (L.Bolus) Klak, present
- Ruschia duthiae (L.Bolus) Schwantes, endemic
- Ruschia ebracteata L.Bolus, accepted as Eberlanzia ebracteata (L.Bolus) H.E.K.Hartmann, present
- Ruschia edentula (Haw.) L.Bolus, endemic
- Ruschia elevata L.Bolus, accepted as Antimima elevata (L.Bolus) H.E.K.Hartmann, present
- Ruschia elineata L.Bolus, endemic
- Ruschia emarcidens L.Bolus ex H.Jacobsen, accepted as Antimima emarcescens (L.Bolus) H.E.K.Hartmann, present
- Ruschia erecta (L.Bolus) Schwantes, endemic
- Ruschia erosa L.Bolus, accepted as Antimima erosa (L.Bolus) H.E.K.Hartmann, present
- Ruschia esterhuyseniae L.Bolus, endemic
- Ruschia evoluta (N.E.Br.) L.Bolus, accepted as Antimima evoluta (N.E.Br.) H.E.K.Hartmann, present
- Ruschia excedens L.Bolus, accepted as Antimima excedens (L.Bolus) Klak, present
- Ruschia exigua L.Bolus, endemic
- Ruschia exsurgens L.Bolus, accepted as Antimima exsurgens (L.Bolus) H.E.K.Hartmann, present
- Ruschia extensa L.Bolus, endemic
- Ruschia fenestrata L.Bolus, accepted as Antimima fenestrata (L.Bolus) H.E.K.Hartmann, present
- Ruschia fergusoniae L.Bolus, accepted as Antimima fergusoniae (L.Bolus) H.E.K.Hartmann, present
- Ruschia festiva (N.E.Br.) Schwantes, endemic
- Ruschia filamentosa (L.) L.Bolus, accepted as Erepsia forficata (L.) Schwantes, present
- Ruschia filipetala L.Bolus, endemic
- Ruschia firma L.Bolus, endemic
- Ruschia floribunda L.Bolus, endemic
- Ruschia foliosa (Haw.) Schwantes, endemic
- Ruschia forficata (L.) L.Bolus, accepted as Erepsia forficata (L.) Schwantes, present
- Ruschia fourcadei L.Bolus, endemic
- Ruschia framesii L.Bolus, endemic
- Ruschia fredericii (L.Bolus) L.Bolus, endemic
- Ruschia frutescens (L.Bolus) L.Bolus, accepted as Stoeberia frutescens (L.Bolus) Van Jaarsv. present
- Ruschia fugitans L.Bolus, endemic
- Ruschia fulleri L.Bolus, accepted as Ebracteola fulleri (L.Bolus) Glen, present
- Ruschia gemina L.Bolus, accepted as Cerochlamys gemina (L.Bolus) H.E.K.Hartmann, present
- Ruschia geminiflora (Haw.) Schwantes, endemic
- Ruschia gibbosa L.Bolus, accepted as Leipoldtia compacta L.Bolus, present
- Ruschia glauca L.Bolus, endemic
- Ruschia globularis L.Bolus, accepted as Ruschia spinosa (L.) Dehn, present
- Ruschia goodiae L.Bolus, endemic
- Ruschia gracilipes L.Bolus, endemic
- Ruschia gracilis L.Bolus, endemic
- Ruschia gracillima L.Bolus, accepted as Antimima gracillima (L.Bolus) H.E.K.Hartmann, present
- Ruschia granitica (L.Bolus) L.Bolus, accepted as Antimima granitica (L.Bolus) H.E.K.Hartmann, indigenous
- Ruschia gravida L.Bolus, accepted as Eberlanzia gravida (L.Bolus) H.E.K.Hartmann, present
- Ruschia griquensis (L.Bolus) Schwantes, endemic
- Ruschia grisea (L.Bolus) Schwantes, endemic
- Ruschia hallii L.Bolus, accepted as Antimima hallii (L.Bolus) H.E.K.Hartmann, present
- Ruschia hamata (L.Bolus) Schwantes, indigenous
- Ruschia hamatilis L.Bolus, accepted as Antimima hamatilis (L.Bolus) H.E.K.Hartmann, present
- Ruschia haworthii H.Jacobsen & G.D.Rowley, endemic
- Ruschia herrei Schwantes, accepted as Antimima herrei (Schwantes) H.E.K.Hartmann, present
- Ruschia heteropetala L.Bolus, endemic
- Ruschia hexamera L.Bolus, accepted as Antimima paripetala (L.Bolus) Klak, endemic
  - Ruschia hexamera L.Bolus var. longipetala L.Bolus, accepted as Antimima paripetala (L.Bolus) Klak, present
- Ruschia holensis L.Bolus, endemic
- Ruschia horrescens L.Bolus, accepted as Ruschia cradockensis (Kuntze) H.E.K.Hartmann & Stuber subsp. cradockensis, present
  - Ruschia horrescens L.Bolus var. densa L.Bolus, accepted as Ruschia cradockensis (Kuntze) H.E.K.Hartmann & Stuber subsp. cradockensis, present
- Ruschia horrida L.Bolus, accepted as Ruschia cradockensis (Kuntze) H.E.K.Hartmann & Stuber subsp. cradockensis, present
- Ruschia hutchinsonii L.Bolus, accepted as Amphibolia laevis (Aiton) H.E.K.Hartmann, present
- Ruschia imbricata (Haw.) Schwantes, endemic
- Ruschia impressa L.Bolus, endemic
- Ruschia inclaudens L.Bolus, accepted as Esterhuysenia inclaudens (L.Bolus) H.E.K.Hartmann, present
- Ruschia inclusa L.Bolus, endemic
- Ruschia inconspicua L.Bolus, indigenous
- Ruschia incumbens L.Bolus, accepted as Phiambolia incumbens (L.Bolus) Klak, present
- Ruschia incurvata L.Bolus, endemic
- Ruschia indecora (L.Bolus) Schwantes, endemic
- Ruschia indurata (L.Bolus) Schwantes, endemic
- Ruschia insidens L.Bolus, accepted as Antimima insidens (L.Bolus) Chess. present
- Ruschia intermedia L.Bolus, endemic
- Ruschia intervallaris L.Bolus, accepted as Antimima intervallaris (L.Bolus) H.E.K.Hartmann, present
- Ruschia intricata (N.E.Br.) H.E.K.Hartmann & Stuber, endemic
- Ruschia intrusa (Kensit) L.Bolus, accepted as Brianhuntleya intrusa (Kensit) Chess. S.A.Hammer & I.Oliv. present
- Ruschia ivori (N.E.Br.) Schwantes, accepted as Antimima ivori (N.E.Br.) H.E.K.Hartmann, present
- Ruschia kakamasensis L.Bolus, accepted as Ruschia barnardii L.Bolus, present
- Ruschia karrachabensis L.Bolus, endemic
- Ruschia karroidea L.Bolus, accepted as Antimima karroidea (L.Bolus) H.E.K.Hartmann, present
- Ruschia karrooica (L.Bolus) L.Bolus, endemic
- Ruschia kenhardtensis L.Bolus, endemic
- Ruschia klaverensis (L.Bolus) Schwantes, accepted as Antimima klaverensis (L.Bolus) H.E.K.Hartmann, present
- Ruschia klipbergensis L.Bolus, endemic
- Ruschia knysnana (L.Bolus) L.Bolus, endemic
  - Ruschia knysnana (L.Bolus) L.Bolus var. angustifolia L.Bolus, accepted as Ruschia knysnana (L.Bolus) L.Bolus, present
- Ruschia koekenaapensis L.Bolus, accepted as Antimima koekenaapensis (L.Bolus) H.E.K.Hartmann, present
- Ruschia komkansica L.Bolus, accepted as Antimima komkansica (L.Bolus) H.E.K.Hartmann, present
- Ruschia kuboosana L.Bolus, endemic
- Ruschia langebaanensis L.Bolus, endemic
- Ruschia lapidicola L.Bolus, endemic
- Ruschia lavisii L.Bolus, endemic
- Ruschia lawsonii (L.Bolus) L.Bolus, accepted as Antimima lawsonii (L.Bolus) H.E.K.Hartmann, present
- Ruschia laxa (Willd.) Schwantes, endemic
- Ruschia laxiflora L.Bolus, endemic
- Ruschia laxipetala L.Bolus, endemic
- Ruschia leipoldtii L.Bolus, accepted as Antimima leipoldtii (L.Bolus) H.E.K.Hartmann, present
- Ruschia leptocalyx L.Bolus, endemic
- Ruschia lerouxiae (L.Bolus) L.Bolus, endemic
- Ruschia leucanthera (L.Bolus) L.Bolus, accepted as Antimima leucanthera (L.Bolus) H.E.K.Hartmann, present
- Ruschia leucosperma L.Bolus, endemic
- Ruschia levynsiae (L.Bolus) Schwantes, accepted as Antimima pumila (Fedde & C.Schust.) H.E.K.Hartmann, present
- Ruschia limbata (N.E.Br.) Schwantes, accepted as Antimima granitica (L.Bolus) H.E.K.Hartmann, indigenous
- Ruschia lineolata (Haw.) Schwantes, endemic
- Ruschia lisabeliae L.Bolus, endemic
- Ruschia littlewoodii L.Bolus, accepted as Phiambolia littlewoodii (L.Bolus) Klak, endemic
- Ruschia lodewykii L.Bolus, accepted as Antimima lodewykii (L.Bolus) H.E.K.Hartmann, present
- Ruschia loganii L.Bolus, accepted as Antimima loganii (L.Bolus) H.E.K.Hartmann, present
- Ruschia lokenbergensis L.Bolus, accepted as Antimima lokenbergensis (L.Bolus) H.E.K.Hartmann, present
- Ruschia longipes L.Bolus, accepted as Antimima longipes (L.Bolus) Dehn, present
- Ruschia luckhoffii L.Bolus, accepted as Antimima luckhoffii (L.Bolus) H.E.K.Hartmann, present
- Ruschia macowanii (L.Bolus) Schwantes, endemic
- Ruschia magnifica Klak, endemic
- Ruschia maleolens L.Bolus, accepted as Antimima maleolens (L.Bolus) H.E.K.Hartmann, present
- Ruschia mariae L.Bolus, endemic
- Ruschia marianae (L.Bolus) Schwantes, endemic
- Ruschia mathewsii L.Bolus, accepted as Antimima mucronata (Haw.) H.E.K.Hartmann, present
- Ruschia maxima (Haw.) L.Bolus, endemic
- Ruschia maxwellii L.Bolus, accepted as Antimima maxwellii (L.Bolus) H.E.K.Hartmann, present
- Ruschia menniei L.Bolus, accepted as Antimima aristulata (Sond.) Chess. & Gideon F.Sm. indigenous
- Ruschia mesklipensis L.Bolus, accepted as Antimima mesklipensis (L.Bolus) H.E.K.Hartmann, present
- Ruschia meyerae Schwantes, accepted as Antimima meyerae (Schwantes) H.E.K.Hartmann, present
- Ruschia meyeri Schwantes, accepted as Antimima papillata (L.Bolus) H.E.K.Hartmann, present
- Ruschia microphylla (Haw.) Schwantes, accepted as Antimima microphylla (Haw.) Dehn, present
- Ruschia middlemostii L.Bolus, endemic
- Ruschia milleflora L.Bolus, accepted as Eberlanzia dichotoma (L.Bolus) H.E.K.Hartmann, present
- Ruschia misera (L.Bolus) L.Bolus, endemic
- Ruschia modesta L.Bolus forma modesta, accepted as Antimima modesta (L.Bolus) H.E.K.Hartmann
  - Ruschia modesta L.Bolus forma glabrescens L.Bolus, accepted as Antimima modesta (L.Bolus) H.E.K.Hartmann
- Ruschia mollis (A.Berger) Schwantes, endemic
- Ruschia montaguensis L.Bolus, endemic
- Ruschia mucronata (Haw.) Schwantes, accepted as Antimima mucronata (Haw.) H.E.K.Hartmann, present
- Ruschia muelleri (L.Bolus) Schwantes, indigenous
- Ruschia muiriana (L.Bolus) Schwantes, endemic
- Ruschia multiflora (Haw.) Schwantes, endemic
- Ruschia muricata L.Bolus, indigenous
- Ruschia mutata G.D.Rowley, endemic
- Ruschia mutica L.Bolus, accepted as Antimima mutica (L.Bolus) H.E.K.Hartmann, present
- Ruschia namaquana L.Bolus, accepted as Amphibolia rupis-arcuatae (Dinter) H.E.K.Hartmann, present
- Ruschia nana L.Bolus, accepted as Octopoma nanum (L.Bolus) Klak, endemic
- Ruschia nelii Schwantes, endemic
- Ruschia neovirens Schwantes, endemic
- Ruschia nieuwerustensis L.Bolus, endemic
- Ruschia nobilis Schwantes, accepted as Antimima nobilis (Schwantes) H.E.K.Hartmann, present
- Ruschia nonimpressa L.Bolus, endemic
- Ruschia nordenstamii L.Bolus, accepted as Antimima nordenstamii (L.Bolus) H.E.K.Hartmann, present
- Ruschia obtusa L.Bolus, endemic
- Ruschia obtusifolia L.Bolus, accepted as Antimima watermeyeri (L.Bolus) H.E.K.Hartmann, present
- Ruschia orientalis L.Bolus, endemic
- Ruschia orsmondiae L.Bolus, accepted as Ruschia canonotata (L.Bolus) Schwantes, present
- Ruschia oviformis L.Bolus, accepted as Antimima oviformis (L.Bolus) H.E.K.Hartmann, present
- Ruschia pakhuisensis L.Bolus, accepted as Ruschiella lunulata (A.Berger) Klak, present
- Ruschia pallens L.Bolus, endemic
- Ruschia papillata L.Bolus, accepted as Antimima papillata (L.Bolus) H.E.K.Hartmann, present
- Ruschia paripetala (L.Bolus) L.Bolus, accepted as Antimima paripetala (L.Bolus) Klak, endemic
  - Ruschia paripetala (L.Bolus) L.Bolus var. occultans L.Bolus, accepted as Antimima perforata (L.Bolus) H.E.K.Hartmann, present
- Ruschia parvibracteata L.Bolus, accepted as Eberlanzia parvibracteata (L.Bolus) H.E.K.Hartmann, present
- Ruschia parviflora (Haw.) Schwantes, endemic
- Ruschia parvifolia L.Bolus, endemic
- Ruschia patens L.Bolus, endemic
- Ruschia patulifolia L.Bolus, endemic
- Ruschia pauciflora L.Bolus, endemic
- Ruschia paucifolia L.Bolus, accepted as Antimima paucifolia (L.Bolus) H.E.K.Hartmann, present
- Ruschia paucipetala L.Bolus, endemic
- Ruschia pauper L.Bolus, accepted as Antimima pauper (L.Bolus) H.E.K.Hartmann, present
- Ruschia peersii L.Bolus, accepted as Antimima peersii (L.Bolus) H.E.K.Hartmann, present
- Ruschia perfoliata (Mill.) Schwantes, endemic
- Ruschia persistens L.Bolus, accepted as Ruschia intricata (N.E.Br.) H.E.K.Hartmann & Stuber, present
- Ruschia phylicoides L.Bolus, endemic
- Ruschia pillansii L.Bolus, accepted as Eberlanzia schneideriana (A.Berger) H.E.K.Hartmann, present
- Ruschia pilosula L.Bolus, accepted as Antimima pilosula (L.Bolus) H.E.K.Hartmann, present
- Ruschia pinguis L.Bolus, endemic
- Ruschia piscodora L.Bolus, accepted as Antimima piscodora (L.Bolus) H.E.K.Hartmann, present
- Ruschia polita L.Bolus, accepted as Braunsia geminata (Haw.) L.Bolus, present
- Ruschia primosii L.Bolus, endemic
- Ruschia profunda L.Bolus, accepted as Lampranthus profundus (L.Bolus) H.E.K.Hartmann, present
- Ruschia prolongata L.Bolus, accepted as Antimima prolongata (L.Bolus) H.E.K.Hartmann, present
- Ruschia promontorii L.Bolus, endemic
- Ruschia propinqua (N.E.Br.) Schwantes, accepted as Antimima propinqua (N.E.Br.) H.E.K.Hartmann, present
- Ruschia prostrata L.Bolus, accepted as Antimima prostrata (L.Bolus) H.E.K.Hartmann, present
- Ruschia pulchella (Haw.) Schwantes, indigenous
  - Ruschia pulchella (Haw.) Schwantes var. caespitosa L.Bolus, accepted as Ruschia pulchella (Haw.) Schwantes, present
- Ruschia pulvinaris L.Bolus, endemic
- Ruschia pumila L.Bolus, accepted as Antimima pumila (Fedde & C.Schust.) H.E.K.Hartmann, present
- Ruschia punctulata (L.Bolus) L.Bolus ex H.E.K.Hartmann, endemic
- Ruschia pungens (A.Berger) H.Jacobsen, endemic
- Ruschia purpureostyla (L.Bolus) Bruyns, accepted as Acrodon purpureostylus (L.Bolus) Burgoyne, present
- Ruschia pusilla Schwantes, accepted as Antimima pusilla (Schwantes) H.E.K.Hartmann, present
- Ruschia putterillii (L.Bolus) L.Bolus, indigenous
- Ruschia pygmaea (Haw.) Schwantes, accepted as Antimima pygmaea (Haw.) H.E.K.Hartmann, present
- Ruschia quadrisepala L.Bolus, accepted as Octopoma quadrisepalum (L.Bolus) H.E.K.Hartmann, present
- Ruschia quarzitica (Dinter) Dinter & Schwantes, accepted as Antimima quarzitica (Dinter) H.E.K.Hartmann
- Ruschia radicans L.Bolus, accepted as Antimima radicans (L.Bolus) Klak, endemic
- Ruschia rariflora L.Bolus, endemic
- Ruschia recurva (Moench) H.E.K.Hartmann, endemic
- Ruschia rigens L.Bolus, endemic
- Ruschia rigida (Haw.) Schwantes, endemic
- Ruschia rigidicaulis (Haw.) Schwantes, endemic
- Ruschia robusta L.Bolus, indigenous
- Ruschia roseola (N.E.Br.) Schwantes, accepted as Antimima roseola (N.E.Br.) H.E.K.Hartmann, present
- Ruschia rostella (Haw.) Schwantes, endemic
- Ruschia rubricaulis (Haw.) L.Bolus, indigenous
- Ruschia rupigena L.Bolus, accepted as Octopoma rupigenum (L.Bolus) L.Bolus, present
- Ruschia rupis-arcuatae (Dinter) Friedrich, accepted as Amphibolia rupis-arcuatae (Dinter) H.E.K.Hartmann
- Ruschia ruralis (N.E.Br.) Schwantes, endemic
- Ruschia salteri L.Bolus, accepted as Hammeria meleagris (L.Bolus) Klak, present
- Ruschia sandbergensis L.Bolus, endemic
- Ruschia sarmentosa (Haw.) Schwantes, endemic
  - Ruschia sarmentosa (Haw.) Schwantes var. rigida (Salm-Dyck) Schwantes, accepted as Ruschia sarmentosa (Haw.) Schwantes, present
- Ruschia saturata L.Bolus, accepted as Antimima saturata (L.Bolus) H.E.K.Hartmann, present
- Ruschia saxicola L.Bolus, accepted as Antimima saxicola (L.Bolus) H.E.K.Hartmann, present
- Ruschia scabra H.E.K.Hartmann, endemic
- Ruschia schlechteri Schwantes, accepted as Antimima schlechteri (Schwantes) H.E.K.Hartmann, present
- Ruschia schneideriana (A.Berger) L.Bolus, accepted as Eberlanzia schneideriana (A.Berger) H.E.K.Hartmann
- Ruschia schollii (Salm-Dyck) Schwantes, endemic
- Ruschia schollii (Salm-Dyck) Schwantes var. caledonica (L.Bolus) Schwantes, accepted as Ruschia schollii (Salm-Dyck) Schwantes, present
- Ruschia sedoides (Dinter & A.Berger) Friedrich, accepted as Eberlanzia sedoides (Dinter & A.Berger) Schwantes
- Ruschia semidentata (Haw.) Schwantes, endemic
- Ruschia semiglobosa L.Bolus, endemic
- Ruschia senaria L.Bolus, endemic
- Ruschia serrulata (Haw.) Schwantes, endemic
- Ruschia sessilis (Thunb.) H.E.K.Hartmann, endemic
- Ruschia simulans L.Bolus, accepted as Antimima simulans (L.Bolus) H.E.K.Hartmann, present
- Ruschia singula L.Bolus, endemic
- Ruschia sobrina (N.E.Br.) Schwantes, accepted as Antimima sobrina (N.E.Br.) H.E.K.Hartmann, present
- Ruschia socia (N.E.Br.) Schwantes, accepted as Argyroderma fissum (Haw.) L.Bolus, present
- Ruschia solida (L.Bolus) L.Bolus var. solida, accepted as Antimima solida (L.Bolus) H.E.K.Hartmann, present
  - Ruschia solida (L.Bolus) L.Bolus var. stigmatosa L.Bolus, accepted as Antimima solida (L.Bolus) H.E.K.Hartmann, present
- Ruschia solitaria L.Bolus, endemic
- Ruschia spinescens L.Bolus, accepted as Arenifera spinescens (L.Bolus) H.E.K.Hartmann, present
- Ruschia spinosa (L.) Dehn, indigenous
- Ruschia staminodiosa L.Bolus, endemic
- Ruschia stayneri L.Bolus, accepted as Antimima stayneri (L.Bolus) H.E.K.Hartmann, present
- Ruschia stellata L.Bolus, accepted as Antimima hantamensis (Engl.) H.E.K.Hartmann & Stuber, present
- Ruschia stenopetala L.Bolus, accepted as Antimima watermeyeri (L.Bolus) H.E.K.Hartmann, present
- Ruschia stenophylla (L.Bolus) L.Bolus, accepted as Marlothistella stenophylla (L.Bolus) S.A.Hammer, present
- Ruschia stokoei L.Bolus, accepted as Antimima stokoei (L.Bolus) H.E.K.Hartmann, present
- Ruschia stricta L.Bolus, endemic
  - Ruschia stricta L.Bolus var. turgida L.Bolus, accepted as Amphibolia saginata (L.Bolus) H.E.K.Hartmann, present
- Ruschia strubeniae (L.Bolus) Schwantes, endemic
- Ruschia stylosa L.Bolus, accepted as Arenifera stylosa (L.Bolus) H.E.K.Hartmann, present
- Ruschia suaveolens L.Bolus, endemic
- Ruschia subaphylla Friedrich, accepted as Ruschia abbreviata L.Bolus
- Ruschia subpaniculata L.Bolus, endemic
- Ruschia subsphaerica L.Bolus, endemic
- Ruschia subteres L.Bolus, endemic
- Ruschia subtruncata L.Bolus var. minor L.Bolus, accepted as Antimima subtruncata (L.Bolus) H.E.K.Hartmann, present
  - Ruschia subtruncata L.Bolus var. subtruncata, accepted as Antimima subtruncata (L.Bolus) H.E.K.Hartmann, present
- Ruschia succulenta L.Bolus, accepted as Amphibolia succulenta (L.Bolus) H.E.K.Hartmann, present
- Ruschia tardissima L.Bolus, endemic
- Ruschia tecta L.Bolus, endemic
- Ruschia tenella (Haw.) Schwantes, endemic
- Ruschia testacea L.Bolus, endemic
- Ruschia tetrasepala L.Bolus, accepted as Octopoma tetrasepalum (L.Bolus) H.E.K.Hartmann, present
- Ruschia thomae L.Bolus var. thomae, accepted as Esterhuysenia stokoei (L.Bolus) H.E.K.Hartmann, present
  - Ruschia thomae L.Bolus var. microstigma L.Bolus, accepted as Esterhuysenia stokoei (L.Bolus) H.E.K.Hartmann, present
- Ruschia translucens L.Bolus, accepted as Stoeberia beetzii (Dinter) Dinter & Schwantes, present
- Ruschia tribracteata L.Bolus, endemic
- Ruschia triflora L.Bolus, endemic
- Ruschia triquetra L.Bolus, accepted as Antimima triquetra (L.Bolus) H.E.K.Hartmann, present
- Ruschia truteri L.Bolus, endemic
- Ruschia tuberculosa L.Bolus, accepted as Antimima tuberculosa (L.Bolus) H.E.K.Hartmann, present
- Ruschia tumidula (Haw.) Schwantes, indigenous
- Ruschia turneriana L.Bolus, accepted as Antimima turneriana (L.Bolus) H.E.K.Hartmann, present
- Ruschia uitenhagensis (L.Bolus) Schwantes, endemic
- Ruschia umbellata (L.) Schwantes, endemic
- Ruschia unca (L.Bolus) L.Bolus, accepted as Phiambolia unca (L.Bolus) Klak, present
- Ruschia uncinata (L.) Schwantes, indigenous
- Ruschia unidens (Haw.) Schwantes, indigenous
- Ruschia utilis (L.Bolus) L.Bolus, accepted as Stoeberia utilis (L.Bolus) Van Jaarsv.
  - Ruschia utilis (L.Bolus) L.Bolus var. giftbergensis L.Bolus, accepted as Stoeberia giftbergensis (L.Bolus) Van Jaarsv. indigenous
- Ruschia vaginata (Haw.) Schwantes, endemic
- Ruschia valida Schwantes, endemic
- Ruschia vanbredai L.Bolus, endemic
- Ruschia vanderbergiae L.Bolus, endemic
- Ruschia vanheerdei L.Bolus, endemic
- Ruschia vanniekerkiae L.Bolus, endemic
- Ruschia vanzylii L.Bolus, accepted as Antimima vanzylii (L.Bolus) H.E.K.Hartmann, present
- Ruschia varians L.Bolus, accepted as Antimima varians (L.Bolus) H.E.K.Hartmann, present
- Ruschia ventricosa (L.Bolus) Schwantes, accepted as Antimima ventricosa (L.Bolus) H.E.K.Hartmann, present
- Ruschia verruculosa L.Bolus, accepted as Antimima verruculosa (L.Bolus) H.E.K.Hartmann, present
- Ruschia versicolor L.Bolus, endemic
- Ruschia vetovalida H.E.K.Hartmann, endemic
- Ruschia victoris (L.Bolus) L.Bolus, endemic
- Ruschia villetii L.Bolus, accepted as Antimima dualis (N.E.Br.) N.E.Br. present
- Ruschia virens L.Bolus, endemic
- Ruschia virgata (Haw.) L.Bolus, endemic
- Ruschia viridifolia L.Bolus, endemic
- Ruschia vulnerans L.Bolus, accepted as Ruschia divaricata L.Bolus, present
- Ruschia watermeyeri L.Bolus, accepted as Antimima watermeyeri (L.Bolus) H.E.K.Hartmann, present
- Ruschia willdenowii Schwantes, endemic
- Ruschia wittebergensis (L.Bolus) Schwantes, accepted as Antimima wittebergensis (L.Bolus) H.E.K.Hartmann, present

== Ruschianthemum ==
Genus Ruschianthemum:

- Ruschianthemum gigas (Dinter) Friedrich, accepted as Stoeberia gigas (Dinter) Dinter & Schwantes

== Ruschiella ==
Genus Ruschiella:

- Ruschiella argentea (L.Bolus) Klak, endemic
- Ruschiella cedrimontana Klak, endemic
- Ruschiella henricii (L.Bolus) Klak, endemic
- Ruschiella lunulata (A.Berger) Klak, endemic

== Saphesia ==
Genus Saphesia:

- Saphesia flaccida (Jacq.) N.E.Br. endemic

== Sceletium ==
Genus Sceletium: (synonym of Mesembryanthemum)

- Sceletium albanense L.Bolus, accepted as Mesembryanthemum crassicaule Haw. indigenous
- Sceletium anatomicum (Haw.) L.Bolus, accepted as Mesembryanthemum emarcidum Thunb. present
- Sceletium archeri L.Bolus, accepted as Mesembryanthemum archeri (L.Bolus) Klak, indigenous
- Sceletium boreale L.Bolus, accepted as Mesembryanthemum tortuosum L. present
- Sceletium compactum L.Bolus, accepted as Mesembryanthemum tortuosum L. present
- Sceletium crassicaule (Haw.) L.Bolus, accepted as Mesembryanthemum crassicaule Haw. endemic
- Sceletium dejagerae L.Bolus, accepted as Mesembryanthemum emarcidum Thunb. present
- Sceletium emarcidum (Thunb.) L.Bolus ex H.Jacobsen, accepted as Mesembryanthemum emarcidum Thunb. endemic
- Sceletium exalatum Gerbaulet, accepted as Mesembryanthemum exalatum (Gerbaulet) Klak, endemic
- Sceletium expansum (L.) L.Bolus, accepted as Mesembryanthemum expansum L. endemic
- Sceletium framesii L.Bolus, accepted as Mesembryanthemum tortuosum L. present
- Sceletium gracile L.Bolus, accepted as Mesembryanthemum tortuosum L. present
- Sceletium joubertii L.Bolus, accepted as Mesembryanthemum tortuosum L. present
- Sceletium namaquense L.Bolus, accepted as Mesembryanthemum tortuosum L. indigenous
  - Sceletium namaquense L.Bolus var. subglobosum L.Bolus, accepted as Mesembryanthemum tortuosum L. present
- Sceletium ovatum L.Bolus, accepted as Mesembryanthemum tortuosum L. present
- Sceletium regium L.Bolus, accepted as Mesembryanthemum expansum L. present
- Sceletium rigidum L.Bolus, accepted as Mesembryanthemum archeri (L.Bolus) Klak, endemic
- Sceletium strictum L.Bolus, accepted as Mesembryanthemum ladismithiense Klak, endemic
- Sceletium subvelutinum L.Bolus forma luxurians L.Bolus, accepted as Mesembryanthemum varians Haw. present
- Sceletium tortuosum (L.) N.E.Br. accepted as Mesembryanthemum tortuosum L. endemic
- Sceletium tugwelliae L.Bolus, accepted as Mesembryanthemum tortuosum L. present
- Sceletium varians (Haw.) Gerbaulet, accepted as Mesembryanthemum varians Haw. endemic

== Schlechteranthus ==
Genus Schlechteranthus:

- Schlechteranthus hallii L.Bolus, endemic
- Schlechteranthus maximilianii Schwantes, endemic

== Schwantesia ==
Genus Schwantesia:

- Schwantesia acutipetala L.Bolus, indigenous
- Schwantesia australis L.Bolus, accepted as Schwantesia ruedebuschii Dinter, present
- Schwantesia borcherdsii L.Bolus, endemic
- Schwantesia herrei L.Bolus, indigenous
  - Schwantesia herrei L.Bolus var. herrei forma major, accepted as Schwantesia herrei L.Bolus
  - Schwantesia herrei L.Bolus var. minor L.Bolus, accepted as Schwantesia herrei L.Bolus
- Schwantesia marlothii L.Bolus, endemic
- Schwantesia pillansii L.Bolus, endemic
- Schwantesia ruedebuschii Dinter, indigenous
- Schwantesia speciosa L.Bolus, endemic
- Schwantesia triebneri L.Bolus, endemic

== Scopelogena ==
Genus Scopelogena :

- Scopelogena bruynsii Klak, endemic
- Scopelogena gracilis L.Bolus, accepted as Scopelogena verruculata (L.) L.Bolus, present
- Scopelogena verruculata (L.) L.Bolus, endemic

== Semnanthe ==
Genus Semnanthe:

- Semnanthe lacera (Haw.) N.E.Br. var. lacera, accepted as Erepsia lacera (Haw.) Liede, present
  - Semnanthe lacera (Haw.) N.E.Br. var. densipetala L.Bolus, accepted as Erepsia lacera (Haw.) Liede, present

== Sesuvium ==
Genus Sesuvium:

- Sesuvium sesuvioides (Fenzl) Verdc. indigenous
  - Sesuvium sesuvioides (Fenzl) Verdc. var. angustifolium (Schinz) M.L.Gonçalves. accepted as Sesuvium sesuvioides (Fenzl) Verdc.

== Sineoperculum ==
Genus Sineoperculum:

- Sineoperculum rourkei (L.Bolus) Van Jaarsv. accepted as Cleretum rourkei (L.Bolus) Klak, present

== Skiatophytum ==
Genus Skiatophytum:

- Skiatophytum tripolium (L.) L.Bolus, endemic

== Smicrostigma ==
Genus Smicrostigma:

- Smicrostigma viride (Haw.) N.E.Br. endemic

== Sphalmanthus ==
Genus Sphalmanthus:

- Sphalmanthus abbreviatus (L.Bolus) L.Bolus, accepted as Mesembryanthemum lilliputanum Klak, indigenous
- Sphalmanthus acocksii L.Bolus, accepted as Mesembryanthemum baylissii (L.Bolus) Klak, present
- Sphalmanthus acuminatus (Haw.) L.Bolus, accepted as Mesembryanthemum splendens L. subsp. splendens, present
- Sphalmanthus albertensis (L.Bolus) L.Bolus, accepted as Mesembryanthemum oubergense (L.Bolus) Klak, indigenous
- Sphalmanthus albicaulis (Haw.) L.Bolus, accepted as Mesembryanthemum splendens L. subsp. splendens, present
- Sphalmanthus anguineus (L.Bolus) L.Bolus, accepted as Mesembryanthemum oculatum N.E.Br. indigenous
- Sphalmanthus arenicolus (L.Bolus) L.Bolus, accepted as Mesembryanthemum oculatum N.E.Br. indigenous
- Sphalmanthus auratus (Sond.) L.Bolus, accepted as Mesembryanthemum nitidum Haw. indigenous
- Sphalmanthus baylissii L.Bolus, accepted as Mesembryanthemum baylissii (L.Bolus) Klak, indigenous
- Sphalmanthus bijliae (N.E.Br.) L.Bolus, accepted as Mesembryanthemum splendens L. subsp. splendens, present
- Sphalmanthus blandus (L.Bolus) L.Bolus, accepted as Mesembryanthemum splendens L. subsp. splendens, present
- Sphalmanthus brevisepalus (L.Bolus) L.Bolus, accepted as Mesembryanthemum spinuliferum Haw. indigenous
  - Sphalmanthus brevisepalus (L.Bolus) L.Bolus var. ferus (L.Bolus) L.Bolus, accepted as Mesembryanthemum spinuliferum Haw. indigenous
- Sphalmanthus calycinus L.Bolus, accepted as Mesembryanthemum canaliculatum Haw. indigenous
- Sphalmanthus canaliculatus (Haw.) N.E.Br. accepted as Mesembryanthemum canaliculatum Haw. indigenous
- Sphalmanthus carneus (Haw.) N.E.Br. accepted as Mesembryanthemum spinuliferum Haw. indigenous
- Sphalmanthus caudatus (L.Bolus) N.E.Br. accepted as Mesembryanthemum caudatum L.Bolus, indigenous
- Sphalmanthus celans (L.Bolus) L.Bolus, accepted as Mesembryanthemum splendens L. subsp. splendens, present
- Sphalmanthus commutatus (A.Berger) N.E.Br. accepted as Mesembryanthemum grossum Aiton, indigenous
- Sphalmanthus congestus (L.Bolus) L.Bolus, accepted as Mesembryanthemum flavidum Klak, indigenous
- Sphalmanthus constrictus (L.Bolus) L.Bolus, accepted as Mesembryanthemum splendens L. subsp. splendens, present
- Sphalmanthus crassus L.Bolus, accepted as Mesembryanthemum prasinum (L.Bolus) Klak, indigenous
- Sphalmanthus deciduus (L.Bolus) L.Bolus, accepted as Mesembryanthemum deciduum (L.Bolus) Klak, indigenous
- Sphalmanthus decurvatus (L.Bolus) L.Bolus, accepted as Mesembryanthemum decurvatum (L.Bolus) Klak, indigenous
- Sphalmanthus decussatus (Thunb.) L.Bolus, accepted as Mesembryanthemum geniculiflorum L. present
- Sphalmanthus defoliatus (Haw.) L.Bolus, accepted as Mesembryanthemum noctiflorum L. subsp. defoliatum (Haw.) Klak, indigenous
- Sphalmanthus delus (L.Bolus) L.Bolus, accepted as Mesembryanthemum delum L.Bolus, indigenous
- Sphalmanthus dinteri (L.Bolus) L.Bolus, accepted as Mesembryanthemum ligneum (L.Bolus) Klak, indigenous
- Sphalmanthus dyeri (L.Bolus) L.Bolus, accepted as Mesembryanthemum splendens L. subsp. splendens, present
- Sphalmanthus englishiae (L.Bolus) L.Bolus, accepted as Mesembryanthemum englishiae L.Bolus, indigenous
- Sphalmanthus flexuosus (Haw.) L.Bolus, accepted as Mesembryanthemum splendens L. subsp. splendens, present
- Sphalmanthus fourcadei (L.Bolus) L.Bolus, accepted as Mesembryanthemum splendens L. subsp. splendens, present
- Sphalmanthus fragilis N.E.Br. accepted as Mesembryanthemum oculatum N.E.Br. indigenous
- Sphalmanthus framesii (L.Bolus) L.Bolus, accepted as Mesembryanthemum spinuliferum Haw. indigenous
- Sphalmanthus geniculiflorus (L.) L.Bolus, accepted as Mesembryanthemum geniculiflorum L. indigenous
- Sphalmanthus glanduliferus (L.Bolus) L.Bolus, accepted as Mesembryanthemum sinuosum L.Bolus, indigenous
- Sphalmanthus godmaniae (L.Bolus) L.Bolus, accepted as Mesembryanthemum sinuosum L.Bolus, indigenous
- Sphalmanthus gratiae (L.Bolus) L.Bolus, accepted as Mesembryanthemum grossum Aiton, indigenous
- Sphalmanthus grossus (Aiton) N.E.Br. accepted as Mesembryanthemum grossum Aiton, indigenous
- Sphalmanthus gydouwensis L.Bolus, accepted as Mesembryanthemum grossum Aiton, indigenous
- Sphalmanthus hallii L.Bolus, accepted as Mesembryanthemum delum L.Bolus, indigenous
- Sphalmanthus herbertii N.E.Br. accepted as Mesembryanthemum lilliputanum Klak, indigenous
- Sphalmanthus herrei L.Bolus, accepted as Mesembryanthemum prasinum (L.Bolus) Klak, indigenous
- Sphalmanthus humilis L.Bolus, accepted as Mesembryanthemum holense Klak, indigenous
- Sphalmanthus latipetalus (L.Bolus) L.Bolus, accepted as Mesembryanthemum latipetalum (L.Bolus) Klak, indigenous
- Sphalmanthus laxipetalus (L.Bolus) L.Bolus, accepted as Mesembryanthemum grossum Aiton, indigenous
- Sphalmanthus laxus (L.Bolus) N.E.Br. accepted as Mesembryanthemum decurvatum (L.Bolus) Klak, present
- Sphalmanthus leipoldtii L.Bolus, accepted as Mesembryanthemum grossum Aiton, indigenous
- Sphalmanthus leptopetalus (L.Bolus) L.Bolus, accepted as Mesembryanthemum splendens L. subsp. splendens, present
- Sphalmanthus lignescens L.Bolus, accepted as Mesembryanthemum lignescens (L.Bolus) Klak, indigenous
- Sphalmanthus ligneus (L.Bolus) L.Bolus, accepted as Mesembryanthemum ligneum (L.Bolus) Klak, indigenous
- Sphalmanthus littlewoodii L.Bolus, accepted as Mesembryanthemum nitidum Haw. indigenous
- Sphalmanthus longipapillatus L.Bolus, accepted as Mesembryanthemum oculatum N.E.Br. indigenous
- Sphalmanthus longispinulus (Haw.) N.E.Br. accepted as Mesembryanthemum grossum Aiton, indigenous
- Sphalmanthus longitubus (L.Bolus) L.Bolus, accepted as Mesembryanthemum tenuiflorum Jacq. indigenous
- Sphalmanthus macrosiphon (L.Bolus) L.Bolus, accepted as Mesembryanthemum tenuiflorum Jacq. indigenous
- Sphalmanthus melanospermus Dinter & Schwantes, accepted as Mesembryanthemum ligneum (L.Bolus) Klak, indigenous
- Sphalmanthus micans L.Bolus, accepted as Mesembryanthemum resurgens Kensit, indigenous
- Sphalmanthus nanus L.Bolus, accepted as Mesembryanthemum tenuiflorum Jacq. indigenous
- Sphalmanthus nitidus (Haw.) L.Bolus, accepted as Mesembryanthemum nitidum Haw. indigenous
- Sphalmanthus nothus (N.E.Br.) Schwantes, accepted as Mesembryanthemum splendens L. subsp. splendens, present
- Sphalmanthus obtusus (L.Bolus) L.Bolus, accepted as Mesembryanthemum decurvatum (L.Bolus) Klak, present
- Sphalmanthus oculatus (N.E.Br.) N.E.Br. accepted as Mesembryanthemum oculatum N.E.Br. indigenous
- Sphalmanthus olivaceus (Schltr. & A.Berger) L.Bolus, accepted as Mesembryanthemum tenuiflorum Jacq. indigenous
- Sphalmanthus oubergensis (L.Bolus) L.Bolus, accepted as Mesembryanthemum oubergense (L.Bolus) Klak, indigenous
- Sphalmanthus pentagonus (L.Bolus) L.Bolus, accepted as Mesembryanthemum splendens L. subsp. pentagonum (L.Bolus) Klak, indigenous
  - Sphalmanthus pentagonus (L.Bolus) L.Bolus var. occidentalis (L.Bolus) L.Bolus, accepted as Mesembryanthemum splendens L. subsp. pentagonum (L.Bolus) Klak, present
- Sphalmanthus platysepalus (L.Bolus) L.Bolus, accepted as Mesembryanthemum grossum Aiton, indigenous
- Sphalmanthus plenifolius (N.E.Br.) L.Bolus, accepted as Mesembryanthemum splendens L. subsp. splendens, present
- Sphalmanthus pomonae (L.Bolus) L.Bolus, accepted as Mesembryanthemum oculatum N.E.Br. indigenous
- Sphalmanthus praecox L.Bolus, accepted as Mesembryanthemum sinuosum L.Bolus, indigenous
- Sphalmanthus prasinus (L.Bolus) L.Bolus, accepted as Mesembryanthemum prasinum (L.Bolus) Klak, indigenous
- Sphalmanthus primulinus (L.Bolus) L.Bolus, accepted as Mesembryanthemum splendens L. subsp. splendens, present
- Sphalmanthus pumulis (L.Bolus) L.Bolus, accepted as Mesembryanthemum oubergense (L.Bolus) Klak, indigenous
- Sphalmanthus quarternus (L.Bolus) L.Bolus, accepted as Mesembryanthemum spinuliferum Haw. indigenous
- Sphalmanthus quarziticus (L.Bolus) L.Bolus, accepted as Mesembryanthemum quartziticola Klak, indigenous
- Sphalmanthus rabiei (L.Bolus) N.E.Br. accepted as Mesembryanthemum rabiei (L.Bolus) Klak, endemic
- Sphalmanthus rabiesbergensis (L.Bolus) L.Bolus, accepted as Mesembryanthemum splendens L. subsp. splendens, present
- Sphalmanthus radicans (L.Bolus) L.Bolus, accepted as Mesembryanthemum rhizophorum Klak, indigenous
- Sphalmanthus recurvus (L.Bolus) L.Bolus, accepted as Mesembryanthemum sinuosum L.Bolus, indigenous
- Sphalmanthus reflexus (Haw.) L.Bolus, accepted as Mesembryanthemum splendens L. subsp. splendens, present
- Sphalmanthus rejuvenalis L.Bolus, accepted as Mesembryanthemum spinuliferum Haw. indigenous
- Sphalmanthus resurgens (Kensit) L.Bolus, accepted as Mesembryanthemum resurgens Kensit, indigenous
- Sphalmanthus rhodandrus (L.Bolus) L.Bolus, accepted as Mesembryanthemum nitidum Haw. indigenous
- Sphalmanthus roseus (L.Bolus) L.Bolus, accepted as Mesembryanthemum splendens L. subsp. splendens, present
- Sphalmanthus salmoneus (Haw.) N.E.Br. accepted as Mesembryanthemum canaliculatum Haw. indigenous
- Sphalmanthus saturatus (L.Bolus) L.Bolus, accepted as Mesembryanthemum baylissii (L.Bolus) Klak, present
- Sphalmanthus scintillans (Dinter) Dinter & Schwantes, accepted as Mesembryanthemum oculatum N.E.Br. indigenous
- Sphalmanthus sinuosus (L.Bolus) L.Bolus, accepted as Mesembryanthemum sinuosum L.Bolus, indigenous
- Sphalmanthus spinuliferus (Haw.) L.Bolus, accepted as Mesembryanthemum spinuliferum Haw. indigenous
- Sphalmanthus splendens (L.) L.Bolus, accepted as Mesembryanthemum splendens L. subsp. splendens, present
- Sphalmanthus stayneri L.Bolus, accepted as Mesembryanthemum delum L.Bolus, indigenous
- Sphalmanthus straminicolor (L.Bolus) L.Bolus, accepted as Mesembryanthemum sinuosum L.Bolus, indigenous
- Sphalmanthus striatus (L.Bolus) L.Bolus, accepted as Mesembryanthemum splendens L. subsp. splendens, present
- Sphalmanthus strictus (L.Bolus) L.Bolus, accepted as Mesembryanthemum spinuliferum Haw. indigenous
- Sphalmanthus suaveolens (L.Bolus) H.Jacobsen, accepted as Mesembryanthemum lignescens (L.Bolus) Klak
- Sphalmanthus subaequans (L.Bolus) L.Bolus, accepted as Mesembryanthemum splendens L. subsp. pentagonum (L.Bolus) Klak, present
- Sphalmanthus subpatens (L.Bolus) L.Bolus, accepted as Mesembryanthemum splendens L. subsp. pentagonum (L.Bolus) Klak, present
- Sphalmanthus subpetiolatus (L.Bolus) L.Bolus, accepted as Mesembryanthemum grossum Aiton, indigenous
- Sphalmanthus suffusus (L.Bolus) L.Bolus, accepted as Mesembryanthemum tetragonum Thunb. indigenous
- Sphalmanthus sulcatus (Haw.) L.Bolus, accepted as Mesembryanthemum splendens L. subsp. splendens, present
- Sphalmanthus tenuiflorus (Jacq.) N.E.Br. accepted as Mesembryanthemum tenuiflorum Jacq. indigenous
- Sphalmanthus tetragonus (Thunb.) L.Bolus, accepted as Mesembryanthemum tetragonum Thunb. indigenous
- Sphalmanthus tetramerus (L.Bolus) L.Bolus, accepted as Mesembryanthemum trichotomum Thunb. indigenous
  - Sphalmanthus tetramerus (L.Bolus) L.Bolus var. parviflorus (L.Bolus) L.Bolus, accepted as Mesembryanthemum trichotomum Thunb. indigenous
- Sphalmanthus trichotomus (Thunb.) L.Bolus, accepted as Mesembryanthemum trichotomum Thunb. indigenous
- Sphalmanthus umbelliflorus (Jacq.) L.Bolus, accepted as Mesembryanthemum splendens L. subsp. splendens, present
- Sphalmanthus vanheerdei L.Bolus, accepted as Mesembryanthemum vanheerdei (L.Bolus) Klak, endemic
- Sphalmanthus varians (L.Bolus) L.Bolus, accepted as Mesembryanthemum oculatum N.E.Br. indigenous
- Sphalmanthus vernalis (L.Bolus) L.Bolus, accepted as Mesembryanthemum splendens L. subsp. splendens, present
- Sphalmanthus vigilans (L.Bolus) L.Bolus, accepted as Mesembryanthemum longistylum DC. indigenous
- Sphalmanthus viridiflorus (Aiton) N.E.Br. accepted as Mesembryanthemum viridiflorum Aiton, indigenous
- Sphalmanthus watermeyeri (L.Bolus) L.Bolus, accepted as Mesembryanthemum spinuliferum Haw. indigenous
- Sphalmanthus willowmorensis (L.Bolus) L.Bolus, accepted as Mesembryanthemum grossum Aiton, indigenous

== Stayneria ==
Genus Stayneria:

- Stayneria neilii (L.Bolus) L.Bolus, endemic

== Stoeberia ==
Genus Stoeberia:

- Stoeberia apetala L.Bolus, accepted as Stoeberia beetzii (Dinter) Dinter & Schwantes
- Stoeberia arborea Van Jaarsv. indigenous
- Stoeberia beetzii (Dinter) Dinter & Schwantes, indigenous
  - Stoeberia beetzii (Dinter) Dinter & Schwantes var. arborescens Friedrich, accepted as Stoeberia beetzii (Dinter) Dinter & Schwantes
- Stoeberia carpii Friedrich, indigenous
- Stoeberia frutescens (L.Bolus) Van Jaarsv. indigenous
- Stoeberia giftbergensis (L.Bolus) Van Jaarsv. endemic
- Stoeberia gigas (Dinter) Dinter & Schwantes, indigenous
- Stoeberia porphyrea H.E.K.Hartmann, accepted as Stoeberia arborea Van Jaarsv. present
- Stoeberia utilis (L.Bolus) Van Jaarsv. indigenous
  - Stoeberia utilis (L.Bolus) Van Jaarsv. subsp. lerouxiae Van Jaarsv. indigenous
  - Stoeberia utilis (L.Bolus) Van Jaarsv. subsp. utilis, indigenous

== Stomatium ==
Genus Stomatium:

- Stomatium acutifolium L.Bolus, endemic
- Stomatium agninum (Haw.) Schwantes, endemic
  - Stomatium agninum (Haw.) Schwantes var. integrifolium (Salm-Dyck) Volk, accepted as Stomatium agninum (Haw.) Schwantes, present
- Stomatium alboroseum L.Bolus, endemic
- Stomatium angustifolium L.Bolus, endemic
- Stomatium beaufortense L.Bolus, endemic
- Stomatium bolusiae Schwantes, endemic
- Stomatium braunsii L.Bolus, endemic
- Stomatium bryantii L.Bolus, endemic
- Stomatium deficiens L.Bolus, endemic
- Stomatium difforme L.Bolus, endemic
- Stomatium duthiae L.Bolus, endemic
- Stomatium ermininum (Haw.) Schwantes, endemic
- Stomatium fulleri L.Bolus, endemic
- Stomatium geoffreyi L.Bolus, endemic
- Stomatium gerstneri L.Bolus, endemic
- Stomatium grandidens L.Bolus, endemic
- Stomatium integrum L.Bolus, endemic
- Stomatium jamesii L.Bolus, endemic
- Stomatium latifolium L.Bolus, endemic
- Stomatium lesliei (Schwantes) Volk, endemic
- Stomatium leve L.Bolus, endemic
- Stomatium loganii L.Bolus, endemic
- Stomatium meyeri L.Bolus, endemic
- Stomatium middelburgense L.Bolus, endemic
- Stomatium murinum (Haw.) Schwantes, endemic
- Stomatium mustellinum (Salm-Dyck) Schwantes, endemic
- Stomatium niveum L.Bolus, accepted as Stomatium alboroseum L.Bolus, present
- Stomatium patulum H.Jacobsen, endemic
- Stomatium paucidens L.Bolus, endemic
- Stomatium peersii L.Bolus, endemic
- Stomatium pluridens L.Bolus, endemic
- Stomatium pyrodorum (Diels) L.Bolus, accepted as Stomatium mustellinum (Salm-Dyck) Schwantes, present
- Stomatium resedolens L.Bolus, endemic
- Stomatium ronaldii L.Bolus, endemic
- Stomatium rouxii L.Bolus, endemic
- Stomatium ryderae L.Bolus, endemic
- Stomatium suaveolens Schwantes, endemic
- Stomatium suricatinum L.Bolus, endemic
- Stomatium trifarium L.Bolus, endemic
- Stomatium villetii L.Bolus, endemic
- Stomatium viride L.Bolus, endemic

== Synaptophyllum ==
Genus Synaptophyllum:

- Synaptophyllum sladenianum (L.Bolus) N.E.Br. accepted as Mesembryanthemum sladenianum L.Bolus, indigenous

== Tanquana ==
Genus Tanquana:

- Tanquana archeri (L.Bolus) H.E.K.Hartmann & Liede, endemic
- Tanquana hilmarii (L.Bolus) H.E.K.Hartmann & Liede, endemic
- Tanquana prismatica (Schwantes) H.E.K.Hartmann & Liede, endemic

== Tetracoilanthus ==
Genus Tetracoilanthus:

- Tetracoilanthus anatomicus (Haw.) Rappa & Camarrone, accepted as Mesembryanthemum emarcidum Thunb. present
- Tetracoilanthus cordifolius (L.f.) Rappa & Camarrone, accepted as Mesembryanthemum cordifolium L.f. indigenous

== Tetragonia ==
Genus Tetragonia:

- Tetragonia acanthocarpa Adamson, endemic
- Tetragonia arbuscula Fenzl, indigenous
- Tetragonia caesia Adamson, endemic
- Tetragonia calycina Fenzl, indigenous
- Tetragonia chenopodioides Eckl. & Zeyh. endemic
- Tetragonia decumbens Mill. indigenous
- Tetragonia dimorphantha Pax, accepted as Tribulocarpus dimorphanthus (Pax) S.Moore, present
- Tetragonia distorta Fenzl, endemic
- Tetragonia echinata Aiton, endemic
- Tetragonia erecta Adamson, endemic
- Tetragonia fruticosa L. endemic
- Tetragonia galenioides Fenzl, endemic
- Tetragonia glauca Fenzl, endemic
- Tetragonia halimoides Fenzl, endemic
- Tetragonia haworthii Fenzl, endemic
- Tetragonia herbacea L. endemic
- Tetragonia hirsuta L.f. endemic
- Tetragonia lasiantha Adamson, endemic
- Tetragonia macroptera Pax, accepted as Tetragonia calycina Fenzl, present
- Tetragonia microptera Fenzl, indigenous
- Tetragonia namaquensis Schltr. endemic
- Tetragonia nigrescens Eckl. & Zeyh. endemic
- Tetragonia pillansii Adamson, endemic
- Tetragonia portulacoides Fenzl, endemic
- Tetragonia reduplicata Welw. ex Oliv. indigenous
- Tetragonia robusta Fenzl, endemic
  - Tetragonia robusta Fenzl var. psiloptera (Fenzl) Adamson, accepted as Tetragonia robusta Fenzl, present
  - Tetragonia robusta Fenzl var. robusta, accepted as Tetragonia robusta Fenzl, present
- Tetragonia rosea Schltr. endemic
- Tetragonia saligna Fenzl, endemic
  - Tetragonia saligna Fenzl var. extrusa Adamson, accepted as Tetragonia saligna Fenzl, present
  - Tetragonia saligna Fenzl var. latifolia Adamson, accepted as Tetragonia saligna Fenzl, present
- Tetragonia sarcophylla Fenzl, endemic
  - Tetragonia sarcophylla Fenzl var. sarcophylla, accepted as Tetragonia sarcophylla Fenzl, present
  - Tetragonia sarcophylla Fenzl var. saxatilis (E.Phillips) Adamson, accepted as Tetragonia sarcophylla Fenzl, present
- Tetragonia sphaerocarpa Adamson, endemic
- Tetragonia spicata L.f. indigenous
  - Tetragonia spicata L.f. var. laxa Adamson, accepted as Tetragonia spicata L.f. present
  - Tetragonia spicata L.f. var. spicata, accepted as Tetragonia spicata L.f. present
- Tetragonia tetragonioides (Pall.) Kuntze, indigenous
- Tetragonia verrucosa Fenzl, indigenous
- Tetragonia virgata Schltr. endemic

== Titanopsis ==
Genus Titanopsis:

- Titanopsis calcarea (Marloth) Schwantes, endemic
- Titanopsis fulleri Tischer, accepted as Titanopsis calcarea (Marloth) Schwantes, present
- Titanopsis hugo-schlechteri (Tischer) Dinter & Schwantes, indigenous
  - Titanopsis hugo-schlechteri (Tischer) Dinter & Schwantes var. alboviridis Dinter, accepted as Titanopsis hugo-schlechteri (Tischer) Dinter & Schwantes
- Titanopsis luckhoffii L.Bolus, accepted as Aloinopsis luckhoffii (L.Bolus) L.Bolus, present
- Titanopsis luederitzii Tischer, accepted as Titanopsis schwantesii (Dinter) Schwantes
- Titanopsis primosii L.Bolus, accepted as Titanopsis schwantesii (Dinter) Schwantes, present
- Titanopsis spathulata (Thunb.) Schwantes, accepted as Aloinopsis spathulata (Thunb.) L.Bolus

== Trianthema ==
Genus Trianthema:

- Trianthema parvifolia E.Mey. ex Sond. indigenous
  - Trianthema parvifolia E.Mey. ex Sond. var. parvifolia, indigenous
  - Trianthema parvifolia E.Mey. ex Sond. var. rubens (Sond.) Adamson, indigenous
- Trianthema portulacastrum L. indigenous
- Trianthema salsoloides Fenzl ex Oliv. indigenous
  - Trianthema salsoloides Fenzl ex Oliv. var. salsoloides, indigenous
  - Trianthema salsoloides Fenzl ex Oliv. var. stenophylla Adamson, indigenous
  - Trianthema salsoloides Fenzl ex Oliv. var. transvaalensis (Schinz) Adamson, indigenous
- Trianthema triquetra Willd. ex Spreng. indigenous
  - Trianthema triquetra Willd. ex Spreng. subsp. triquetra, indigenous
  - Trianthema triquetra Willd. ex Spreng. subsp. triquetra var. triquetra, indigenous

== Tribulocarpus ==
Genus Tribulocarpus:

- Tribulocarpus dimorphanthus (Pax) S.Moore, indigenous

== Trichocyclus ==
Genus Trichocyclus:

- Trichocyclus marlothii (Pax) N.E.Br. accepted as Mesembryanthemum marlothii Pax, indigenous
- Trichocyclus pubescens N.E.Br. ex C.A.Maass, accepted as Mesembryanthemum tomentosum Klak, indigenous
- Trichocyclus schenckii (Schinz) Dinter & Schwantes ex Range, accepted as Mesembryanthemum schenkii Schinz, indigenous

== Trichodiadema ==
Genus Trichodiadema:

- Trichodiadema attonsum (L.Bolus) Schwantes, endemic
- Trichodiadema aureum L.Bolus, endemic
- Trichodiadema barbatum (L.) Schwantes, endemic
- Trichodiadema bulbosum (Haw.) Schwantes, accepted as Trichodiadema intonsum (Haw.) Schwantes, present
- Trichodiadema burgeri L.Bolus, endemic
- Trichodiadema calvatum L.Bolus, endemic
- Trichodiadema concinnum L.Bolus, accepted as Trichodiadema intonsum (Haw.) Schwantes, present
- Trichodiadema decorum (N.E.Br.) Stearn ex H.Jacobsen, endemic
- Trichodiadema densum (Haw.) Schwantes, endemic
- Trichodiadema emarginatum L.Bolus, endemic
- Trichodiadema fergusoniae L.Bolus, endemic
- Trichodiadema fourcadei L.Bolus, endemic
- Trichodiadema gracile L.Bolus, endemic
  - Trichodiadema gracile L.Bolus var. piliferum L.Bolus, accepted as Trichodiadema gracile L.Bolus, present
  - Trichodiadema gracile L.Bolus var. setiferum L.Bolus, accepted as Trichodiadema gracile L.Bolus, present
- Trichodiadema hallii L.Bolus, endemic
- Trichodiadema hirsutum (Haw.) Stearn, endemic
- Trichodiadema imitans L.Bolus, endemic
- Trichodiadema intonsum (Haw.) Schwantes, endemic
- Trichodiadema introrsum (Haw. ex Hook.f.) Niesler, endemic
- Trichodiadema littlewoodii L.Bolus, indigenous
  - Trichodiadema littlewoodii L.Bolus forma alba L.Bolus, accepted as Trichodiadema littlewoodii L.Bolus
- Trichodiadema marlothii L.Bolus, endemic
- Trichodiadema mirabile (N.E.Br.) Schwantes, endemic
  - Trichodiadema mirabile (N.E.Br.) Schwantes var. leptum L.Bolus, accepted as Trichodiadema mirabile (N.E.Br.) Schwantes, present
- Trichodiadema obliquum L.Bolus, endemic
- Trichodiadema occidentale L.Bolus, endemic
- Trichodiadema olivaceum L.Bolus, endemic
- Trichodiadema orientale L.Bolus, endemic
- Trichodiadema peersii L.Bolus, endemic
- Trichodiadema pomeridianum L.Bolus, indigenous
- Trichodiadema pygmaeum L.Bolus, endemic
- Trichodiadema rogersiae L.Bolus, endemic
- Trichodiadema rupicola L.Bolus, endemic
- Trichodiadema ryderae L.Bolus, endemic
- Trichodiadema schimperi (Engl.) Herre, accepted as Delosperma schimperi (Engl.) H.E.K.Hartmann & Niesler
- Trichodiadema setuliferum (N.E.Br.) Schwantes, endemic
  - Trichodiadema setuliferum (N.E.Br.) Schwantes var. niveum L.Bolus, accepted as Trichodiadema setuliferum (N.E.Br.) Schwantes, present
- Trichodiadema stayneri L.Bolus, endemic
- Trichodiadema stellatum (Mill.) Schwantes, accepted as Trichodiadema barbatum (L.) Schwantes, present
- Trichodiadema stelligerum (Haw.) Schwantes, accepted as Trichodiadema barbatum (L.) Schwantes, present
- Trichodiadema strumosum (Haw.) L.Bolus, endemic

== Vanheerdea ==
Genus Vanheerdea:

- Vanheerdea angusta (L.Bolus) L.Bolus, accepted as Vanheerdea roodiae (N.E.Br.) L.Bolus ex H.E.K.Hartmann, present
- Vanheerdea divergens (L.Bolus) L.Bolus, accepted as Vanheerdea roodiae (N.E.Br.) L.Bolus ex H.E.K.Hartmann, present
- Vanheerdea primosii (L.Bolus) L.Bolus ex H.E.K.Hartmann, endemic
- Vanheerdea roodiae (N.E.Br.) L.Bolus ex H.E.K.Hartmann, endemic

== Vanzijlia ==
Genus Vanzijlia:

- Vanzijlia annulata (A.Berger) L.Bolus, endemic

== Vlokia ==
Genus Vlokia:

- Vlokia ater S.A.Hammer, endemic
- Vlokia montana Klak, endemic

== Volkeranthus ==
Genus Volkeranthus:

- Volkeranthus aitonis (Jacq.) Gerbaulet, accepted as Mesembryanthemum aitonis Jacq. indigenous
- Volkeranthus longistylus (DC.) Gerbaulet, accepted as Mesembryanthemum longistylum DC. indigenous

== Wooleya ==
Genus Wooleya:

- Wooleya farinosa (L.Bolus) L.Bolus, endemic

== Zaleya ==
Genus Zaleya:

- Zaleya pentandra (L.) C.Jeffrey, indigenous

== Zeuktophyllum ==
Genus Zeuktophyllum:

- Zeuktophyllum calycinum (L.Bolus) H.E.K.Hartmann, endemic
- Zeuktophyllum suppositum (L.Bolus) N.E.Br. endemic
