= Lampranthus turbinatus =

Scientific classification
- Kingdom: Plantae
- Clade: Tracheophytes
- Clade: Angiosperms
- Clade: Eudicots
- Order: Caryophyllales
- Family: Aizoaceae
- Genus: Lampranthus
- Species: L. turbinatus

Binomial name
- Lampranthus turbinatus (Jacq.) N.E.Br.

Synonyms
- Mesembryanthemum turbinatum Jacq.

Species of succulent

Lampranthus turbinatus is a succulent plant belonging to the genus Lampranthus. The species is endemic to the Eastern Cape. Botanists now widely classify this species as a synonym of Lampranthus spectabilis, which is famously known as the trailing ice plant.
