= Lampranthus explanatus =

Scientific classification
- Kingdom: Plantae
- Clade: Tracheophytes
- Clade: Angiosperms
- Clade: Eudicots
- Order: Caryophyllales
- Family: Aizoaceae
- Genus: Lampranthus
- Species: L. explanatus

Binomial name
- Lampranthus explanatus (L.Bolus) N.E.Br.

Synonyms
- Lampranthus sternens L.Bolus; Mesembryanthemum explanatum L.Bolus

Species of succulent

Lampranthus explanatus, commonly known as the Sandveld brightfig, is a succulent belonging to the genus Lampranthus. The species is endemic to the Western Cape and occurs from Redelinghuys to the Cape Peninsula and the Agulhas Plain, where it forms part of the fynbos. The plant has an extent of occurrence of 19,472 km². It has lost 50% of its habitat to coastal and urban development, crop cultivation, and invasive plants. In the Sandveld, large areas of the habitat have been converted into rooibos tea and potato fields.
