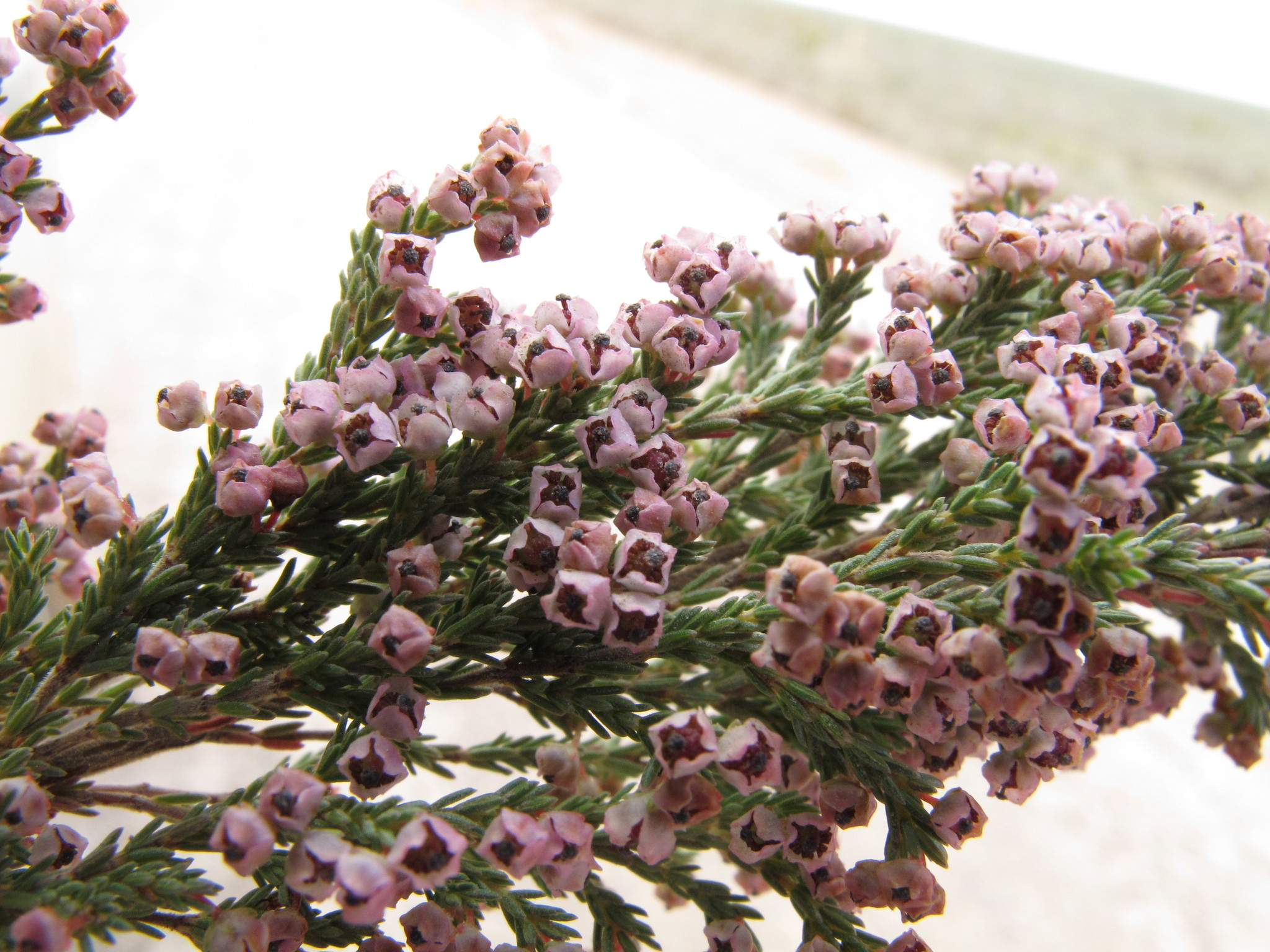

Scientific classification
- Kingdom: Plantae
- Clade: Tracheophytes
- Clade: Angiosperms
- Clade: Eudicots
- Clade: Asterids
- Order: Ericales
- Family: Ericaceae
- Genus: Erica
- Species: E. flexistyla

Binomial name
- Erica flexistyla E.G.H.Oliv.

= Erica flexistyla =

Species of flowering plant

Erica flexistyla is a plant belonging to the genus Erica and forming part of the fynbos. The species is endemic to the Western Cape and occurs on the Agulhas Plain from Elim to the Soetanysberg. The plant's range is 43 km2 and there are between two and five populations. The habitat is threatened by overgrazing, agricultural activities and invasive plants.
