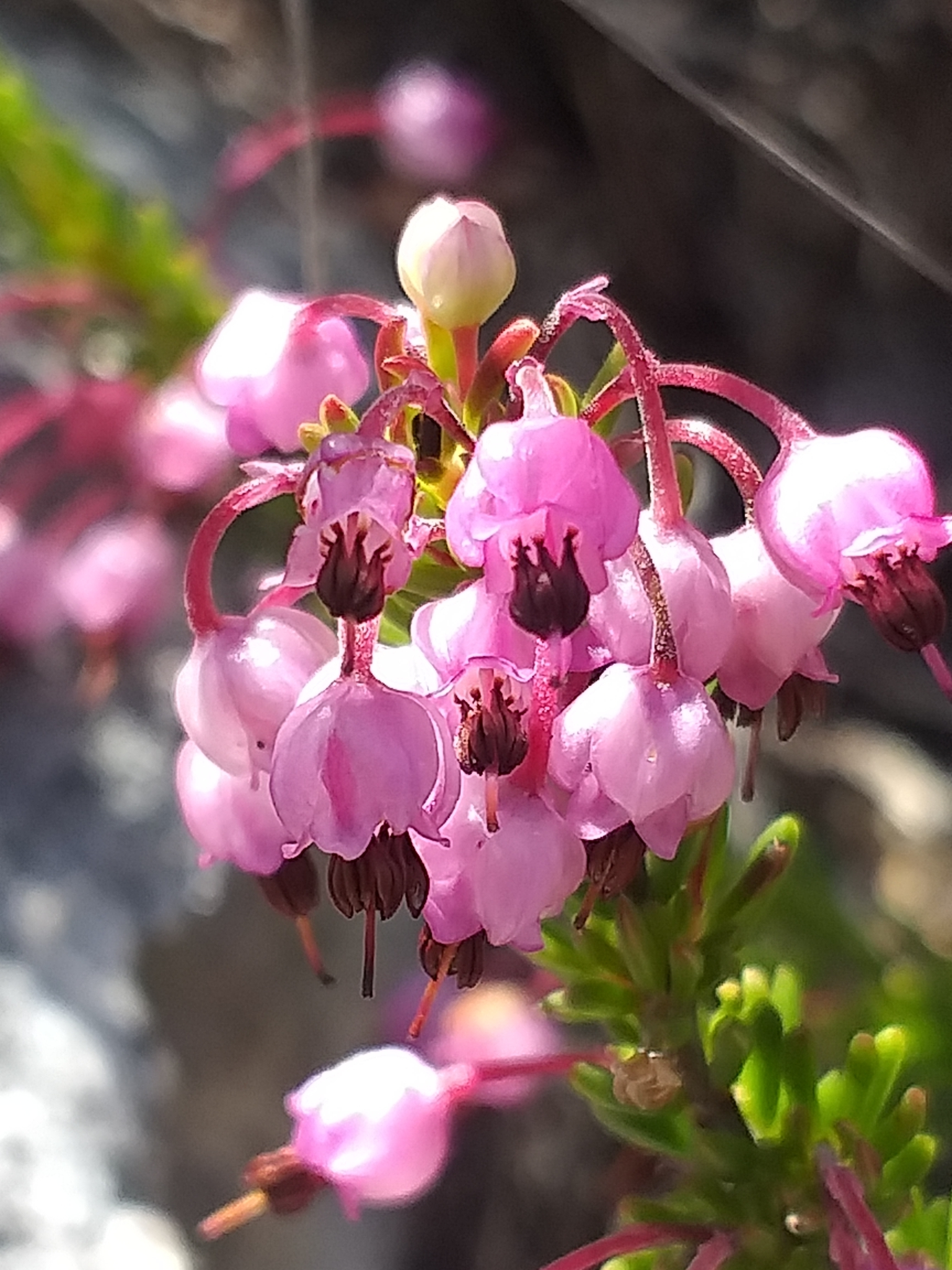

Scientific classification
- Kingdom: Plantae
- Clade: Tracheophytes
- Clade: Angiosperms
- Clade: Eudicots
- Clade: Asterids
- Order: Ericales
- Family: Ericaceae
- Genus: Erica
- Species: E. gracilipes

Binomial name
- Erica gracilipes Guthrie & Bolus

= Erica gracilipes =

Species of flowering plant

Erica gracilipes is a plant belonging to the genus Erica and forming part of the fynbos. The species is endemic to the Western Cape and occurs on the southern Agulhas Plain. The range of the plant is 45 km^{2} and there are three segmented subpopulations. The habitat is threatened by invasive plants, especially acacias, as well as overuse by the cut flower industry. The cultivation of proteas has resulted in parts of the habitat being lost.
