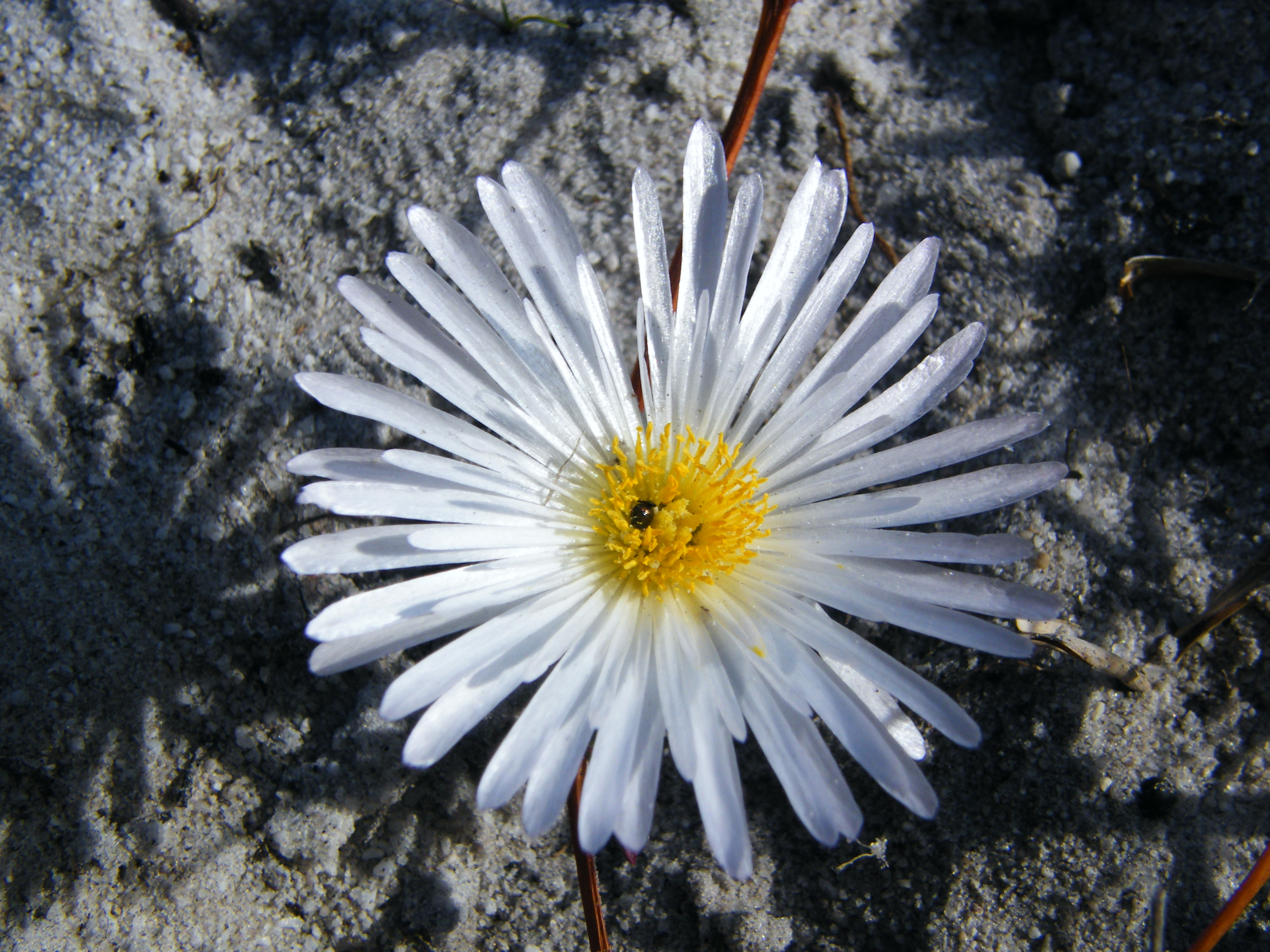

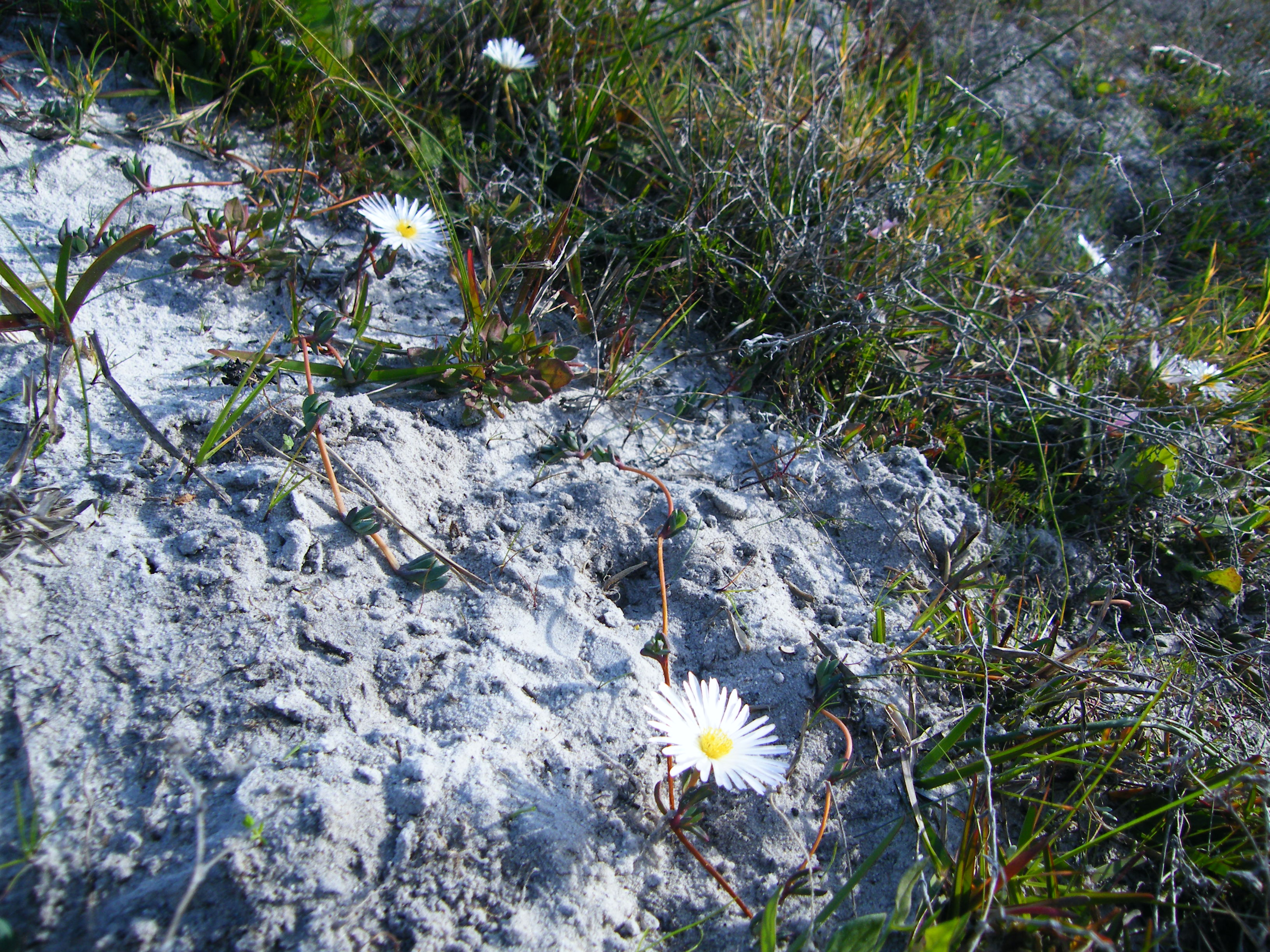

Scientific classification
- Kingdom: Plantae
- Clade: Tracheophytes
- Clade: Angiosperms
- Clade: Eudicots
- Order: Caryophyllales
- Family: Aizoaceae
- Genus: Lampranthus
- Species: L. reptans

Binomial name
- Lampranthus reptans (Aiton) N.E.Br.

Synonyms
- Lampranthus serpens (L.Bolus) L.Bolus; Lampranthus woodburniae (L.Bolus) N.E.Br.; Mesembryanthemum repens Salisb.; Mesembryanthemum reptans Aiton; Mesembryanthemum serpens L.Bolus; Mesembryanthemum woodburniae L.Bolus

= Lampranthus reptans =

Species of succulent

Lampranthus reptans, commonly known as the creeping bright fig or trailing vygie, is a succulent belonging to the genus Lampranthus. The species is endemic to the Western Cape and forms part of the fynbos. It occurs from Malmesbury to Worcester, the Cape Peninsula, and the Agulhas Plain. The plant has an extent of occurrence of 10,348 km² and is threatened by urban and coastal development, crop cultivation, and invasive plants.
