= Lampranthus ceriseus =

Conservation status
- Vulnerable (SANBI Red List)

Scientific classification
- Kingdom: Plantae
- Clade: Tracheophytes
- Clade: Angiosperms
- Clade: Eudicots
- Order: Caryophyllales
- Family: Aizoaceae
- Genus: Lampranthus
- Species: L. ceriseus

Binomial name
- Lampranthus ceriseus (L.Bolus) L.Bolus

Synonyms
- Lampranthus galpiniae (L.Bolus) L.Bolus; Lampranthus salteri (L.Bolus) L.Bolus; Mesembryanthemum ceriseum L.Bolus; Mesembryanthemum galpiniae L.Bolus; Mesembryanthemum salteri L.Bolus

Species of succulent

Lampranthus ceriseus, commonly known as the cerise brightfig, is a succulent belonging to the genus Lampranthus. The species is endemic to the Western Cape and forms part of the fynbos and strandveld vegetation. It occurs from the Agulhas Plain to Riversdale. It has an extent of occurrence of less than 8,000 km², and fewer than ten subpopulations remain. The plant has lost large portions of its habitat to crop cultivation, coastal development, and invasive plants.
