= Lampranthus dregeanus =

Conservation status
- Least Concern (SANBI Red List)

Scientific classification
- Kingdom: Plantae
- Clade: Tracheophytes
- Clade: Angiosperms
- Clade: Eudicots
- Order: Caryophyllales
- Family: Aizoaceae
- Genus: Lampranthus
- Species: L. dregeanus

Binomial name
- Lampranthus dregeanus (Sond.) N.E.Br.

Synonyms
- Erepsia dregeana (Sond.) Schwantes; Lampranthus globosus L.Bolus; Lampranthus gracilipes (L.Bolus) N.E.Br.; Mesembryanthemum cymbifolium Eckl. & Zeyh.; Mesembryanthemum dregeanum Sond.; Mesembryanthemum globosum L.Bolus; Mesembryanthemum gracilipes L.Bolus; Mesembryanthemum strictum Eckl. & Zeyh.

Species of succulent

Lampranthus dregeanus is a succulent belonging to the genus Lampranthus. The species is endemic to the Northern Cape and Western Cape and forms part of the fynbos. It occurs from the Kamiesberge and Gifberge southwards to Villiersdorp. The population is stable.
