= Lampranthus emarginatus =

Scientific classification
- Kingdom: Plantae
- Clade: Tracheophytes
- Clade: Angiosperms
- Clade: Eudicots
- Order: Caryophyllales
- Family: Aizoaceae
- Genus: Lampranthus
- Species: L. emarginatus

Binomial name
- Lampranthus emarginatus (L.) N.E.Br.

Synonyms
- Mesembryanthemum emarginatum L.; Mesembryanthemum polyphyllum Haw.; Mesembryanthemum puniceum Jacq.; Mesembryanthemum versicolor Haw.

Species of succulent

Lampranthus emarginatus, commonly known as the cluster-leaf brightfig, is a succulent plant belonging to the genus Lampranthus. The species is endemic to the Western Cape and forms part of the fynbos.
