= Lampranthus debilis =

Scientific classification
- Kingdom: Plantae
- Clade: Tracheophytes
- Clade: Angiosperms
- Clade: Eudicots
- Order: Caryophyllales
- Family: Aizoaceae
- Genus: Lampranthus
- Species: L. debilis

Binomial name
- Lampranthus debilis (Haw.) N.E.Br.

Synonyms
- Lampranthus arbuthnotiae (L.Bolus) L.Bolus; Lampranthus caespitosus (L.Bolus) N.E.Br.; Lampranthus ernestii (L.Bolus) L.Bolus; Lampranthus tegens (F.Muell.) N.E.Br.; Mesembryanthemum arbuthnotiae L.Bolus; Mesembryanthemum caespitosum L.Bolus; Mesembryanthemum debile Haw.; Mesembryanthemum ernestii L.Bolus; Mesembryanthemum tegens F.Muell.

Species of succulent

Lampranthus debilis, commonly known as the runty brightfig, is a succulent belonging to the genus Lampranthus. The species is endemic to the Western Cape and forms part of the fynbos, strandveld, and renosterveld vegetation types. It occurs from the Cape Flats to Bredasdorp. Fifteen subpopulations were originally known, but five have been lost due to development on the Cape Flats. The remaining ten subpopulations are threatened by invasive plants and crop cultivation in the Bredasdorp area.
