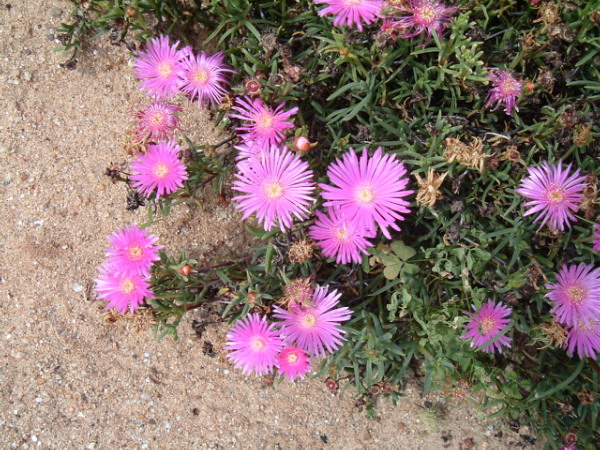

Scientific classification
- Kingdom: Plantae
- Clade: Tracheophytes
- Clade: Angiosperms
- Clade: Eudicots
- Order: Caryophyllales
- Family: Aizoaceae
- Genus: Lampranthus
- Species: L. productus

Binomial name
- Lampranthus productus (Haw.) N.E.Br.

Synonyms
- Lampranthus mutans (L.Bolus) N.E.Br.; Mesembryanthemum lepidum Haw.; Mesembryanthemum mutans L.Bolus; Mesembryanthemum productum Haw.

= Lampranthus productus =

Species of succulent

Lampranthus productus, commonly known as the purple ice plant, is a succulent belonging to the genus Lampranthus. The species is endemic to the Eastern Cape and Western Cape and forms part of the fynbos.
