= Lampranthus peacockiae =

Scientific classification
- Kingdom: Plantae
- Clade: Tracheophytes
- Clade: Angiosperms
- Clade: Eudicots
- Order: Caryophyllales
- Family: Aizoaceae
- Genus: Lampranthus
- Species: L. peacockiae

Binomial name
- Lampranthus peacockiae (L.Bolus) L.Bolus

Synonyms
- Mesembryanthemum peacockiae L.Bolus

Species of succulent

Lampranthus peacockiae is a succulent belonging to the genus Lampranthus. The species is endemic to the Western Cape and occurs from Tulbagh and Darling to the Cape Peninsula. The plant has an extent of occurrence of 1,400 km², and eight fragmented subpopulations remain after the species lost the majority of its habitat to wheat cultivation. The remaining subpopulations are threatened by invasive plants, overgrazing, and suburban development.
