= Lampranthus coralliflorus =

Scientific classification
- Kingdom: Plantae
- Clade: Tracheophytes
- Clade: Angiosperms
- Clade: Eudicots
- Order: Caryophyllales
- Family: Aizoaceae
- Genus: Lampranthus
- Species: L. coralliflorus

Binomial name
- Lampranthus coralliflorus (Salm-Dyck) N.E.Br.

Synonyms
- Erepsia coralliflora (Salm-Dyck) Schwantes; Lampranthus dependens (L.Bolus) L.Bolus; Mesembryanthemum coralliflorum Salm-Dyck; Mesembryanthemum corallinum Harv.; Mesembryanthemum dependens L.Bolus; Mesembryanthemum laeve Haw.

Species of succulent

Lampranthus coralliflorus, also known as Lampranthus coralliflora, is a succulent plant belonging to the genus Lampranthus. The species is endemic to the Eastern Cape.
