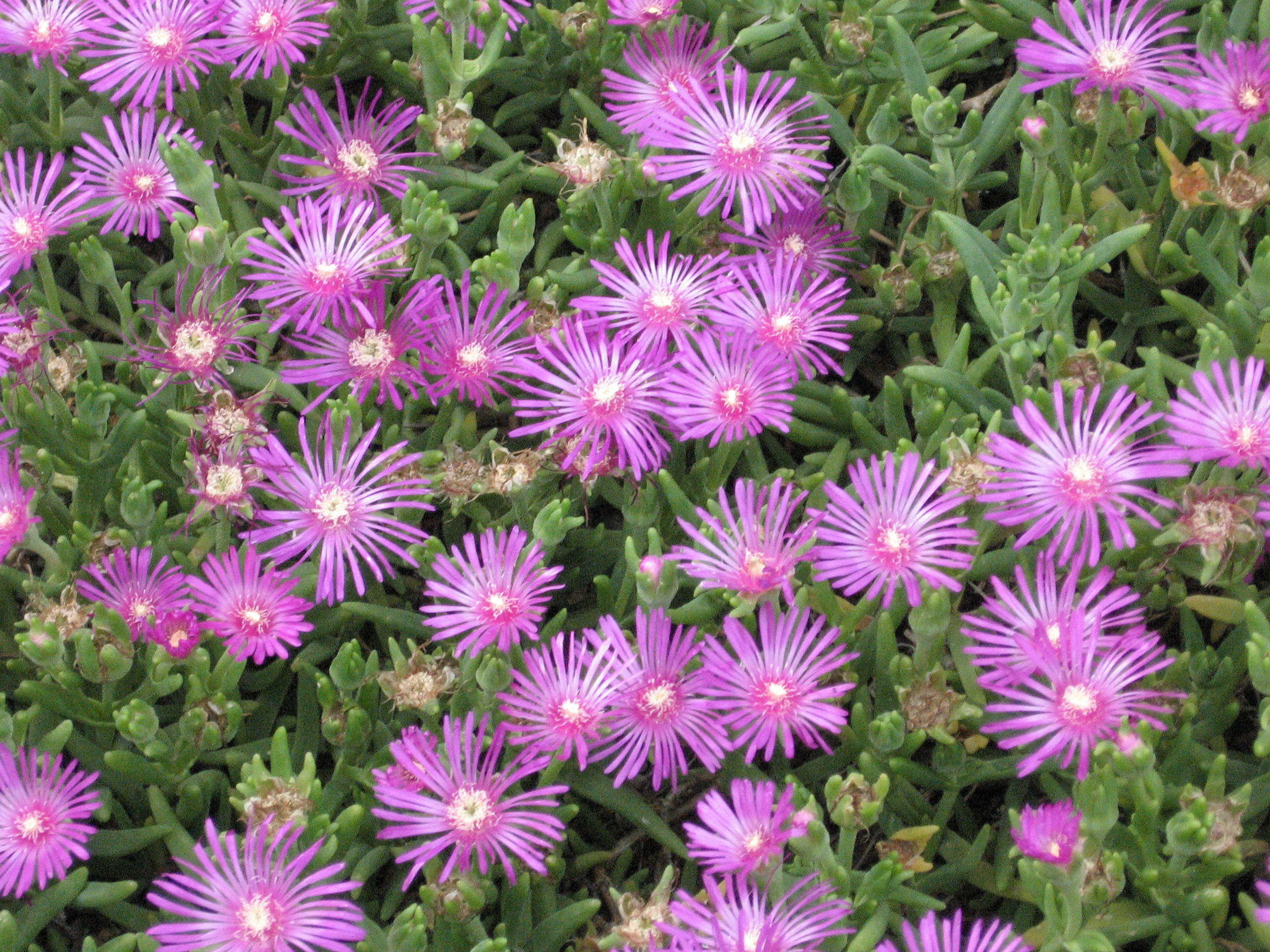

Scientific classification
- Kingdom: Plantae
- Clade: Tracheophytes
- Clade: Angiosperms
- Clade: Eudicots
- Order: Caryophyllales
- Family: Aizoaceae
- Genus: Lampranthus
- Species: L. spiniformis

Binomial name
- Lampranthus spiniformis (Haw.) N.E.Br.

Synonyms
- Lampranthus inconspicuus (Haw.) Schwantes; Lampranthus nelii L.Bolus; Mesembryanthemum inconspicuum Haw.; Mesembryanthemum spiniforme Haw.

= Lampranthus spiniformis =

Species of succulent

Lampranthus spiniformis, commonly known as the renoster brightfig or spiny ice plant, is a succulent belonging to the genus Lampranthus. The species is endemic to the Western Cape and occurs from Saron to Genadendal. The plant is part of the fynbos and renosterveld vegetation and has an extent of occurrence of 11,794 km². It has already lost 70% of its habitat to development and crop cultivation. The plant is currently threatened by overgrazing, invasive plants, and the lack of a fire management program. The existing subpopulations are severely fragmented.
