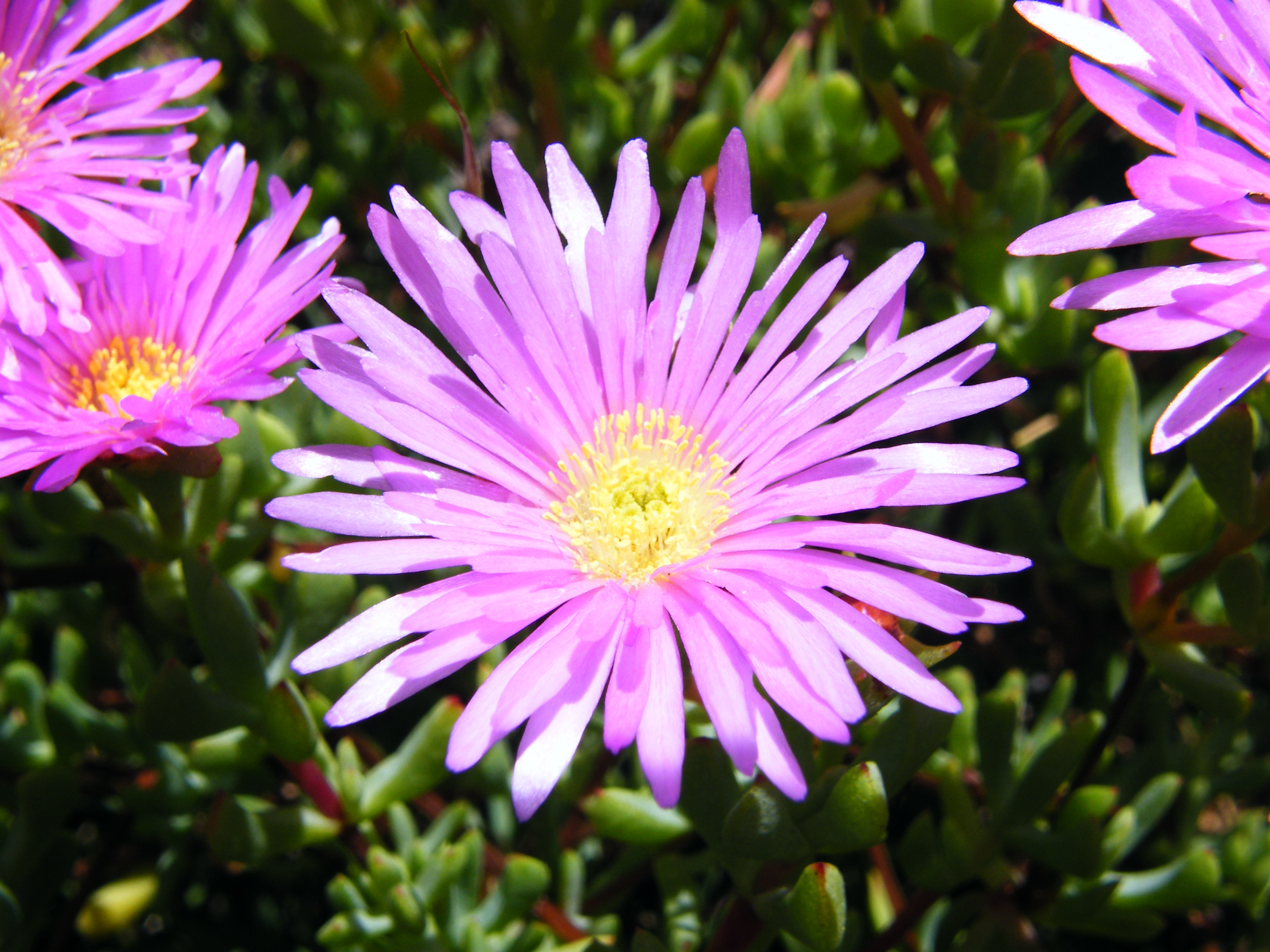

Scientific classification
- Kingdom: Plantae
- Clade: Tracheophytes
- Clade: Angiosperms
- Clade: Eudicots
- Order: Caryophyllales
- Family: Aizoaceae
- Genus: Lampranthus
- Species: L. falciformis

Binomial name
- Lampranthus falciformis (Haw.) N.E.Br.

Synonyms
- Mesembryanthemum falciforme Haw.; Oscularia falciformis (Haw.) H.E.K.Hartmann

= Lampranthus falciformis =

Species of succulent

Lampranthus falciformis, commonly known as the sickle-leaved dewplant, is a succulent plant belonging to the genus Lampranthus. The species is endemic to the Western Cape. Population numbers are stable.
