= Lampranthus suavissimus =

Scientific classification
- Kingdom: Plantae
- Clade: Tracheophytes
- Clade: Angiosperms
- Clade: Eudicots
- Order: Caryophyllales
- Family: Aizoaceae
- Genus: Lampranthus
- Species: L. suavissimus

Binomial name
- Lampranthus suavissimus L.Bolus

Synonyms
- Mesembryanthemum suavissimum L.Bolus

Species of succulent

Lampranthus suavissimus, commonly known in Afrikaans as the langbeen-t'nouroebos, is a succulent plant belonging to the genus Lampranthus. The species is native to Namibia and the Northern Cape.
