= Lampranthus glomeratus =

Scientific classification
- Kingdom: Plantae
- Clade: Tracheophytes
- Clade: Angiosperms
- Clade: Eudicots
- Order: Caryophyllales
- Family: Aizoaceae
- Genus: Lampranthus
- Species: L. glomeratus

Binomial name
- Lampranthus glomeratus (L.) N.E.Br.

Synonyms
- Lampranthus aestivus (L.Bolus) L.Bolus; Lampranthus austricola (L.Bolus) L.Bolus; Lampranthus furvus (L.Bolus) N.E.Br.; Mesembryanthemum aestivum L.Bolus; Mesembryanthemum austricola L.Bolus; Mesembryanthemum furvum L.Bolus; Mesembryanthemum glomeratum L.; Mesembryanthemum inflexum Haw.

Species of succulent

Lampranthus glomeratus, commonly known as the ball brightfig, is a succulent plant belonging to the genus Lampranthus. The species is endemic to the Western Cape and forms part of the fynbos. It occurs from the Cape Peninsula to Kleinmond and has an extent of occurrence of 95 km². Nine of the eleven known subpopulations are considered extinct due to invasive plants and development, while the remaining two subpopulations are threatened by invasive plants.
