= Lampranthus purpureus =

Scientific classification
- Kingdom: Plantae
- Clade: Tracheophytes
- Clade: Angiosperms
- Clade: Eudicots
- Order: Caryophyllales
- Family: Aizoaceae
- Genus: Lampranthus
- Species: L. purpureus

Binomial name
- Lampranthus purpureus L.Bolus

Species of succulent

Lampranthus purpureus is a succulent belonging to the genus Lampranthus. The species is endemic to the Western Cape and occurs in the Olifants River Valley near Keerom. The plant was last sighted in the 1930s, and there is uncertainty regarding its continued existence. It is part of the fynbos biome.
