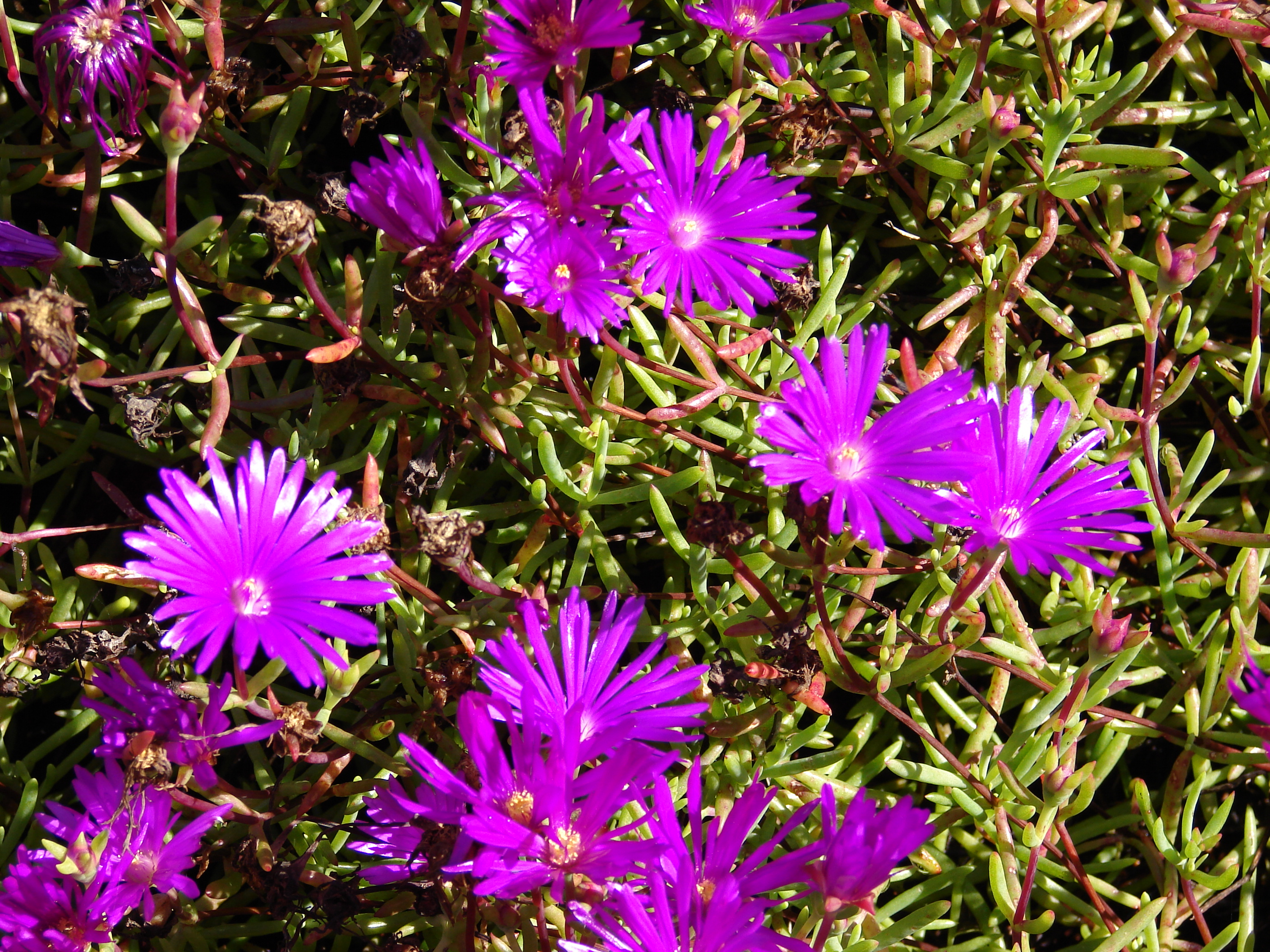

Scientific classification
- Kingdom: Plantae
- Clade: Tracheophytes
- Clade: Angiosperms
- Clade: Eudicots
- Order: Caryophyllales
- Family: Aizoaceae
- Genus: Lampranthus
- Species: L. multiradiatus

Binomial name
- Lampranthus multiradiatus (Jacq.) N.E.Br.

Synonyms
- Lampranthus blandus (Haw.) Schwantes; Lampranthus glaucus var. tortuosus (Haw.) Schwantes; Lampranthus incurvus (Haw.) Schwantes; Lampranthus roseus (Willd.) Schwantes; Mesembryanthemum blandum Haw.; Mesembryanthemum confertum Haw.; Mesembryanthemum glaucum var. tortuosum Haw.; Mesembryanthemum incurvum Haw.; Mesembryanthemum multiradiatum Jacq.; Mesembryanthemum roseum Willd.

= Lampranthus multiradiatus =

Species of plant

Lampranthus multiradiatus, synonyms including Lampranthus roseus, known as the creeping redflush or rosy dewplant, is a species of shrub in the family Aizoaceae (stone plants). They are succulent plants with grey-green shoots. They have a self-supporting growth form and simple, broad leaves. The daisy type flowers have yellow centres and petals that vary between pink and purple depending on the season.

== Sources ==
This article incorporates text from a free content work. Licensed under CC0 (license statement/permission). Text taken from Lampranthus multiradiatus. Encyclopedia of Life.
