= Lampranthus aduncus =

Scientific classification
- Kingdom: Plantae
- Clade: Tracheophytes
- Clade: Angiosperms
- Clade: Eudicots
- Order: Caryophyllales
- Family: Aizoaceae
- Genus: Lampranthus
- Species: L. aduncus

Binomial name
- Lampranthus aduncus (Haw.) N.E.Br.

Synonyms
- Mesembryanthemum aduncum Haw.; Lampranthus curvifolius (Haw.) N.E.Br.; Lampranthus wordsworthiae (L.Bolus) N.E.Br.; Mesembryanthemum aduncum Willd.; Mesembryanthemum ceratophyllum Willd.; Mesembryanthemum curvifolium Haw.; Mesembryanthemum wordsworthiae L.Bolus; Ruschia willdenowii Schwantes

Species of succulent

Lampranthus aduncus, commonly known as the bakoven brightfig, is a succulent belonging to the genus Lampranthus. The species is endemic to the Western Cape and occurs from the Gifberge to the Cape Peninsula. The plant forms part of the fynbos and is difficult to identify. It is threatened by crop cultivation and suburban development.
