= Lampranthus esterhuyseniae =

Conservation status
- Least Concern (SANBI Red List)

Scientific classification
- Kingdom: Plantae
- Clade: Tracheophytes
- Clade: Angiosperms
- Clade: Eudicots
- Order: Caryophyllales
- Family: Aizoaceae
- Genus: Lampranthus
- Species: L. esterhuyseniae

Binomial name
- Lampranthus esterhuyseniae L.Bolus

Synonyms
- Lampranthus littlewoodii L.Bolus; Lampranthus vanheerdei L.Bolus

Species of succulent

Lampranthus esterhuyseniae is a succulent plant belonging to the genus Lampranthus. The species is endemic to the Northern Cape.
