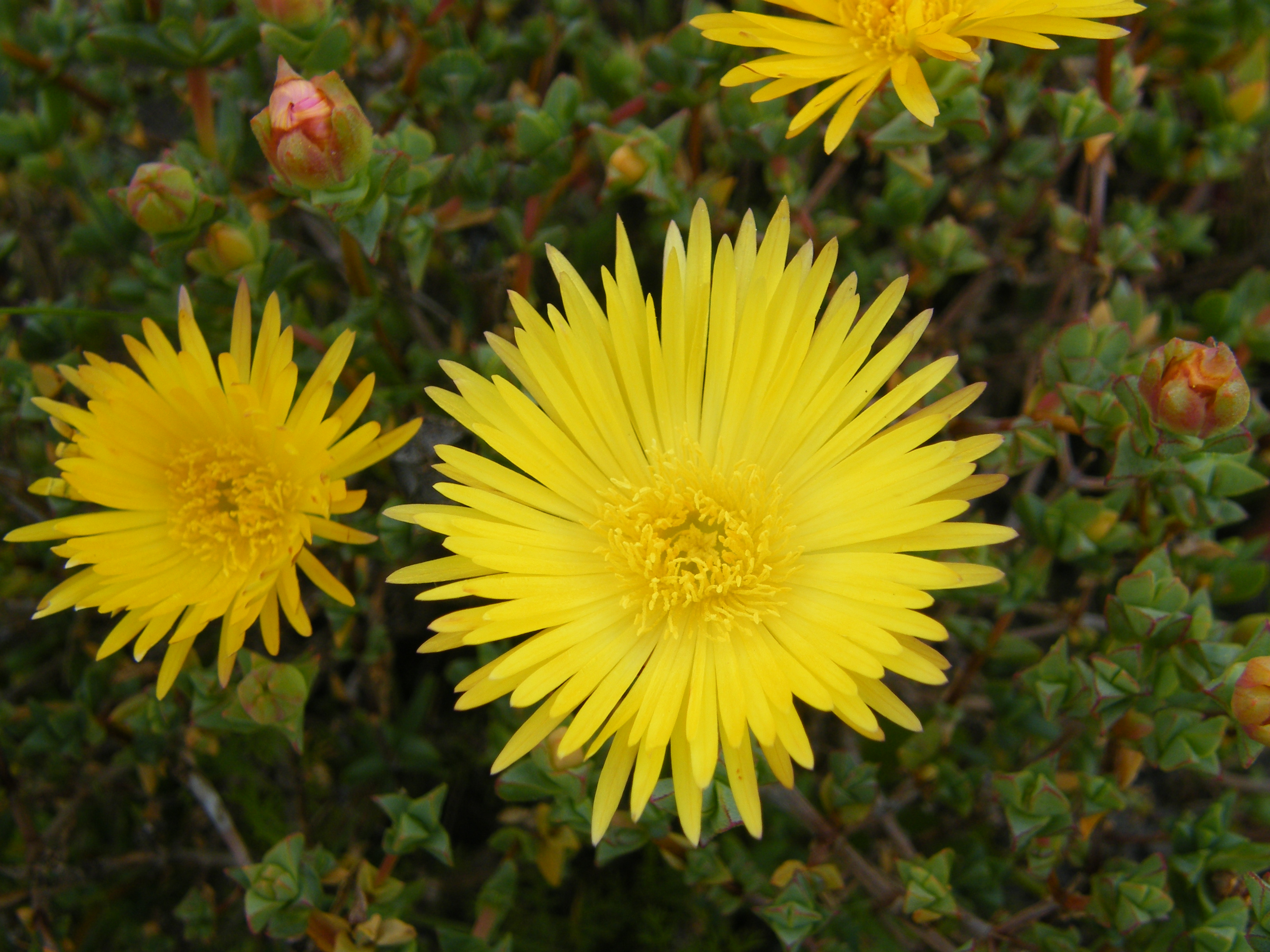
- Lampranthus glaucus

Scientific classification
- Kingdom: Plantae
- Clade: Tracheophytes
- Clade: Angiosperms
- Clade: Eudicots
- Order: Caryophyllales
- Family: Aizoaceae
- Genus: Lampranthus
- Species: L. glaucus

Binomial name
- Lampranthus glaucus (L.) N.E.Br.

= Lampranthus glaucus =

Species of succulent

Lampranthus glaucus is a plant species in the genus Lampranthus native to South Africa and naturalized in gardens all around the world.

The compact and rounded shrub typically grows to a height of 0.1 to 0.3 metres (0.3 to 1.0 ft). It has succulent leaves and produces masses of orange to yellow flowers from August to October. It is considered an invasive introduced species in Western Australia and New Zealand. The flowers open completely in the sun and are called noon flowers. It grows well in well-drained sandy soils and poorly in clay soils.

The species was first formally described as Mesembryanthemum glaucum by the botanist Carl Linnaeus in 1753 in his work Species Plantarum. It was subsequently reclassified by Nicholas Edward Brown in 1930 in the journal Gardeners' Chronicle. Many other synonyms exist including; Lampranthus glaucoides, Lampranthus aurantiacus, Mesembryanthemum aurantium and Mesembryanthemum aurantiacum.
