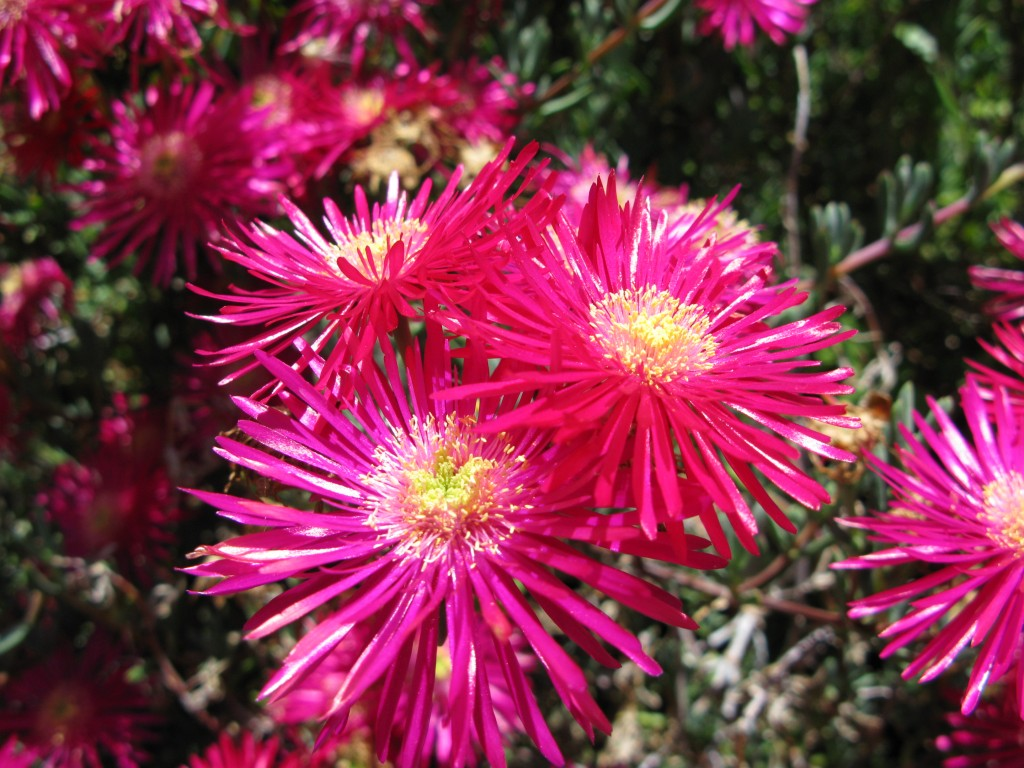
- In bloom in Madeira

Scientific classification
- Kingdom: Plantae
- Clade: Embryophytes
- Clade: Tracheophytes
- Clade: Angiosperms
- Clade: Eudicots
- Order: Caryophyllales
- Family: Aizoaceae
- Genus: Lampranthus
- Species: L. zeyheri

Binomial name
- Lampranthus zeyheri (Salm-Dyck) N.E.Br.

Synonyms
- Mesembryanthemum haworthii Eckl. & Zeyh.; Mesembryanthemum zeyheri Salm-Dyck

= Lampranthus zeyheri =

Species of flowering plant

Lampranthus zeyheri, the trailing iceplant (a name it shares with other members of its family), is a species of flowering plant in the family Aizoaceae, native to the eastern Cape Provinces of South Africa. It is occasionally planted as an ornamental.
