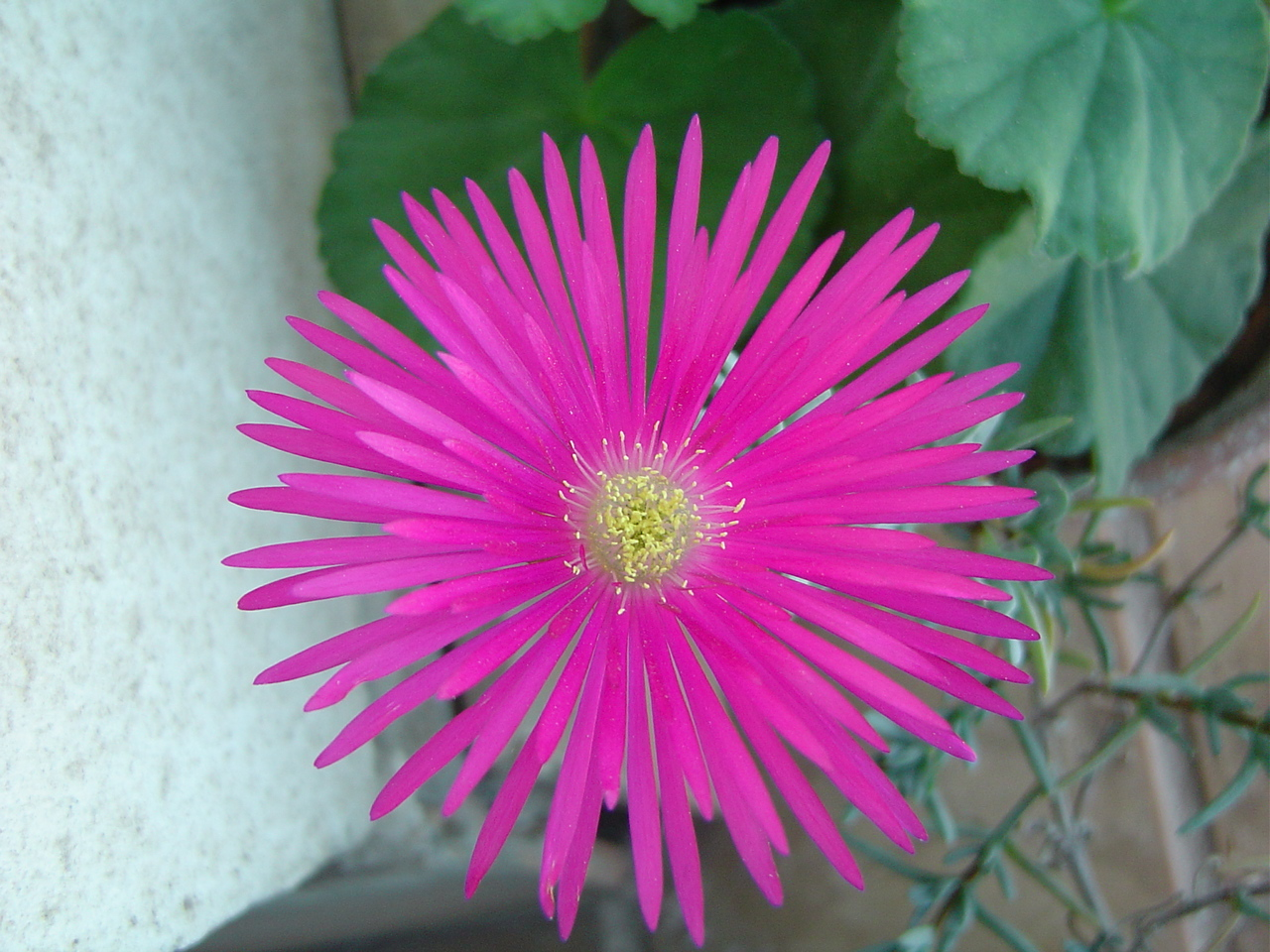

Scientific classification
- Kingdom: Plantae
- Clade: Tracheophytes
- Clade: Angiosperms
- Clade: Eudicots
- Order: Caryophyllales
- Family: Aizoaceae
- Genus: Lampranthus
- Species: L. coccineus

Binomial name
- Lampranthus coccineus (Haw.) N.E.Br.

Synonyms
- Lampranthus sauerae (L.Bolus) L.Bolus; Mesembryanthemum coccineum Haw.; Mesembryanthemum sauerae L.Bolus; Mesembryanthemum tenuifolium Eckl. & Zeyh.

= Lampranthus coccineus =

Species of succulent

Lampranthus coccineus, commonly known as the rooi vygie, rose vygie, or red brightfig, is a flowering plant that blooms in spring and is endemic to the Western Cape, where it forms part of the fynbos vegetation. It is found in the area stretching from Graafwater to Saldanha and Darling, with an extent of occurrence of 1,063 km². However, the species has already lost 80% of its habitat to crop cultivation, and only five small subpopulations remain. Crops grown in the area include rooibos tea and potatoes. The total population consists of fewer than 250 plants.

It is a fast-growing, trailing plant with small, fleshy leaves and glossy, bright red flowers that open only on sunny days. There are many other related species. The plant prefers full sun and little water.
