= Lampranthus scaber =

Scientific classification
- Kingdom: Plantae
- Clade: Tracheophytes
- Clade: Angiosperms
- Clade: Eudicots
- Order: Caryophyllales
- Family: Aizoaceae
- Genus: Lampranthus
- Species: L. scaber

Binomial name
- Lampranthus scaber (L.) N.E.Br.

Synonyms
- Lampranthus paarlensis L.Bolus; Mesembryanthemum scabrum L.

Species of succulent

Lampranthus scaber, commonly known as the rough brightfig, is a succulent belonging to the genus Lampranthus. The species is endemic to the Western Cape and occurs from Tulbagh to the Cape Flats and Piketberg. The plant is part of the fynbos and renosterveld vegetation and has an extent of occurrence of less than 20 km². Currently, only five of the original fourteen subpopulations remain, as the plant has lost habitat to wheat cultivation and the establishment of vineyards. It is also currently threatened by invasive plants.
