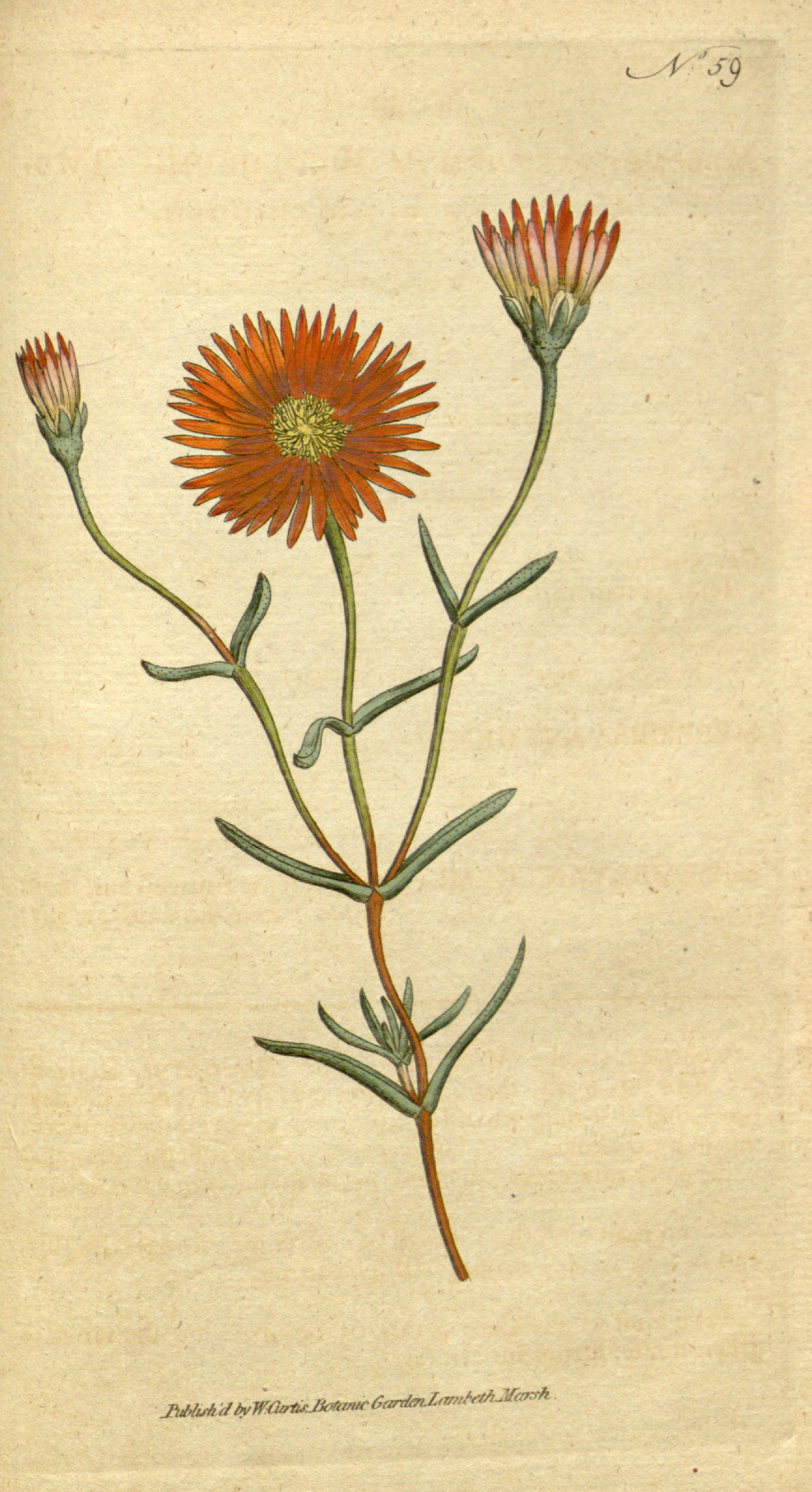
- Botanical illustration

Scientific classification
- Kingdom: Plantae
- Clade: Tracheophytes
- Clade: Angiosperms
- Clade: Eudicots
- Order: Caryophyllales
- Family: Aizoaceae
- Genus: Lampranthus
- Species: L. bicolor

Binomial name
- Lampranthus bicolor (L.) N.E.Br.

Synonyms
- List: Lampranthus acrosepalus (L.Bolus) L.Bolus; Lampranthus antemeridianus (L.Bolus) L.Bolus; Lampranthus inaequalis (Haw.) N.E.Br.; Lampranthus rubroluteus (L.Bolus) L.Bolus; Lampranthus variabilis (Haw.) N.E.Br.; Mesembryanthemum acrosepalum L.Bolus; Mesembryanthemum antemeridianum L.Bolus; Mesembryanthemum bicolor L.; Mesembryanthemum bicolorum L.; Mesembryanthemum coccineum Eckl. & Zeyh.; Mesembryanthemum inaequale Haw.; Mesembryanthemum rubroluteum L.Bolus; Mesembryanthemum variabile Haw.; Mesembryanthus bicolor (L.) Rothm.

= Lampranthus bicolor =

Species of plant

Lampranthus bicolor, the bicoloured lampranthus, is a species of flowering plant in the family Aizoaceae, native to the southwestern Cape Provinces of South Africa. A spreading succulent reaching 30 cm (12 in), it prefers to grow in sandy areas.
