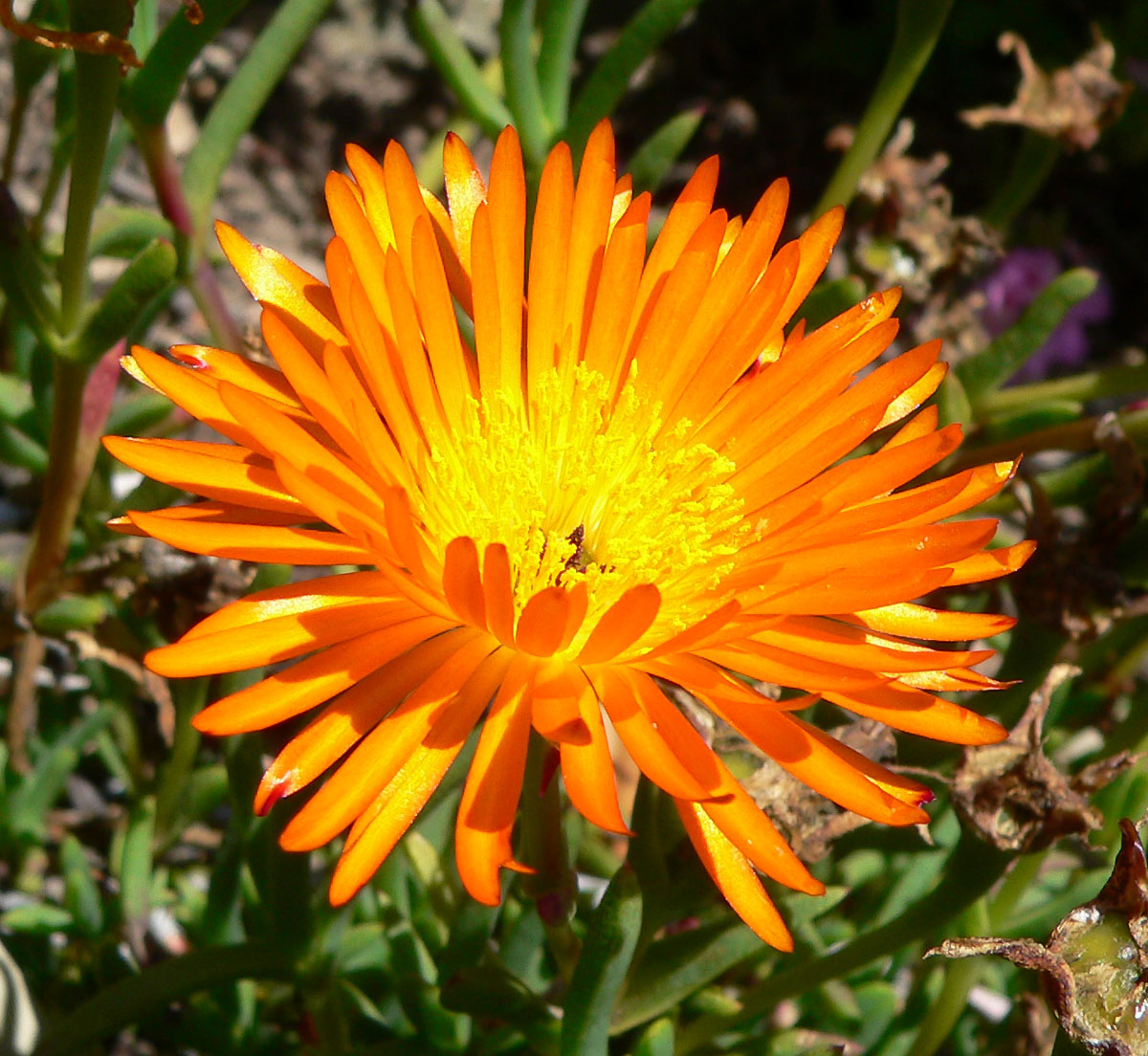
- Lampranthus glaucoides

Scientific classification
- Kingdom: Plantae
- Clade: Tracheophytes
- Clade: Angiosperms
- Clade: Eudicots
- Order: Caryophyllales
- Family: Aizoaceae
- Subfamily: Ruschioideae
- Tribe: Ruschieae
- Genus: Lampranthus; N.E.Br.

Type species
- Lampranthus multiradiatus (Jacq.) N.E.Br.

Species
- See text

Synonyms
- Esterhuysenia L.Bolus; Roosia van Jaarsv.

= Lampranthus =

Genus of succulents

Lampranthus is a genus of succulent plants in the family Aizoaceae, which are native to Namibia and the Cape Provinces of South Africa in southern Africa.

== Description ==
The genus name "Lampranthus" means "shining-flowers" in Greek, and the species of this genus have unusually large, bright flowers, of a range of colours (sometimes even bi-coloured), that usually appear in summer, and frequently cover the plants entirely.

The species of this genus typically have long, smooth, elongated, succulent leaves. These can be triangular or cylindrical, and like all plants in its family, appear in opposite pairs on the shrubs' branches.

Lampranthus can be clearly distinguished from related genera by its seed capsules. The seed capsules of all of these genera have triangular valves, which open when they become wet, exposing the seed chambers (locules). In contrast to Ruschia, each valve in a Lampranthus capsule has two wings, on either side of it, but no visible closing body. Unlike in Delosperma, the seeds in Lampranthus seed chambers are partially covered by a covering membrane. Lampranthus seeds sometimes have visible stalks too.

=== Reproduction ===
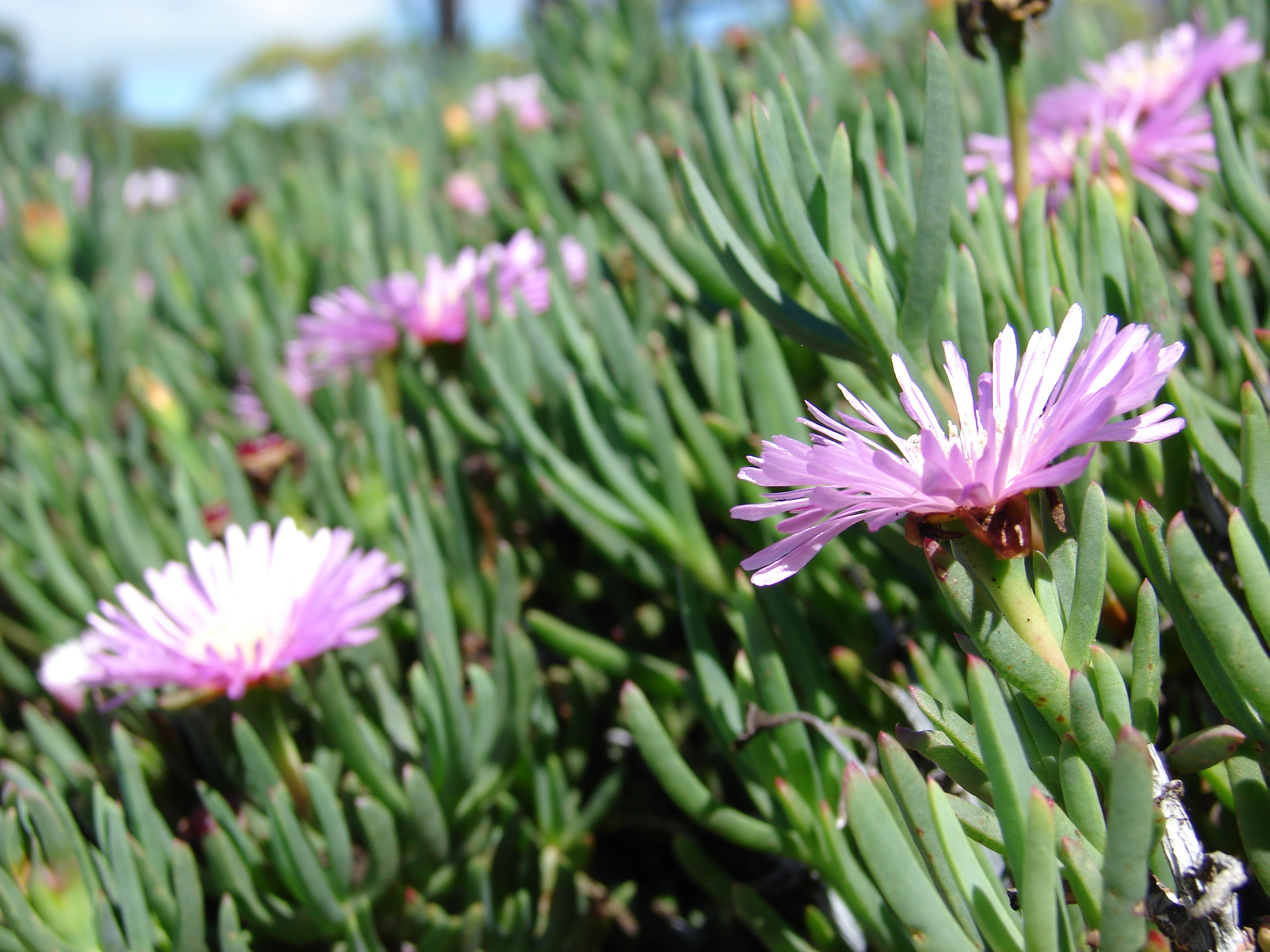
Lampranthus multiradiatus

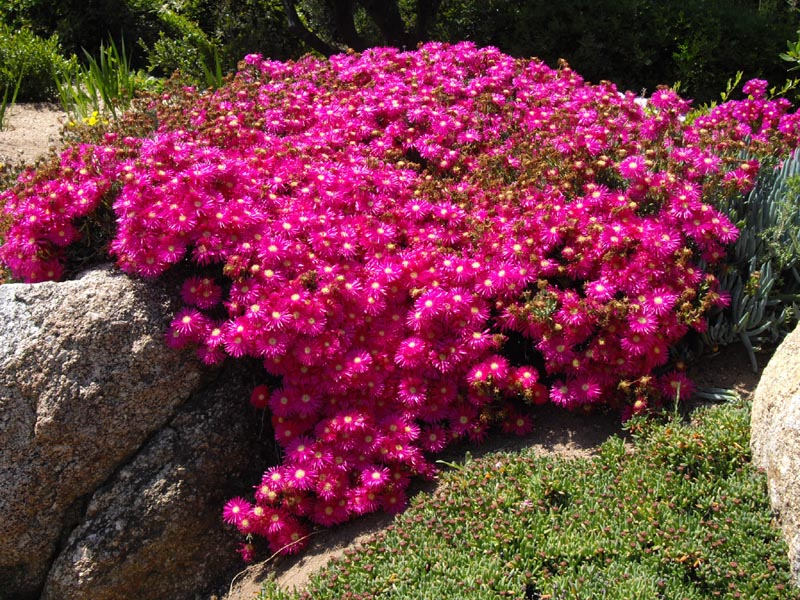
Lampranthus flowers often cover the entire plant.

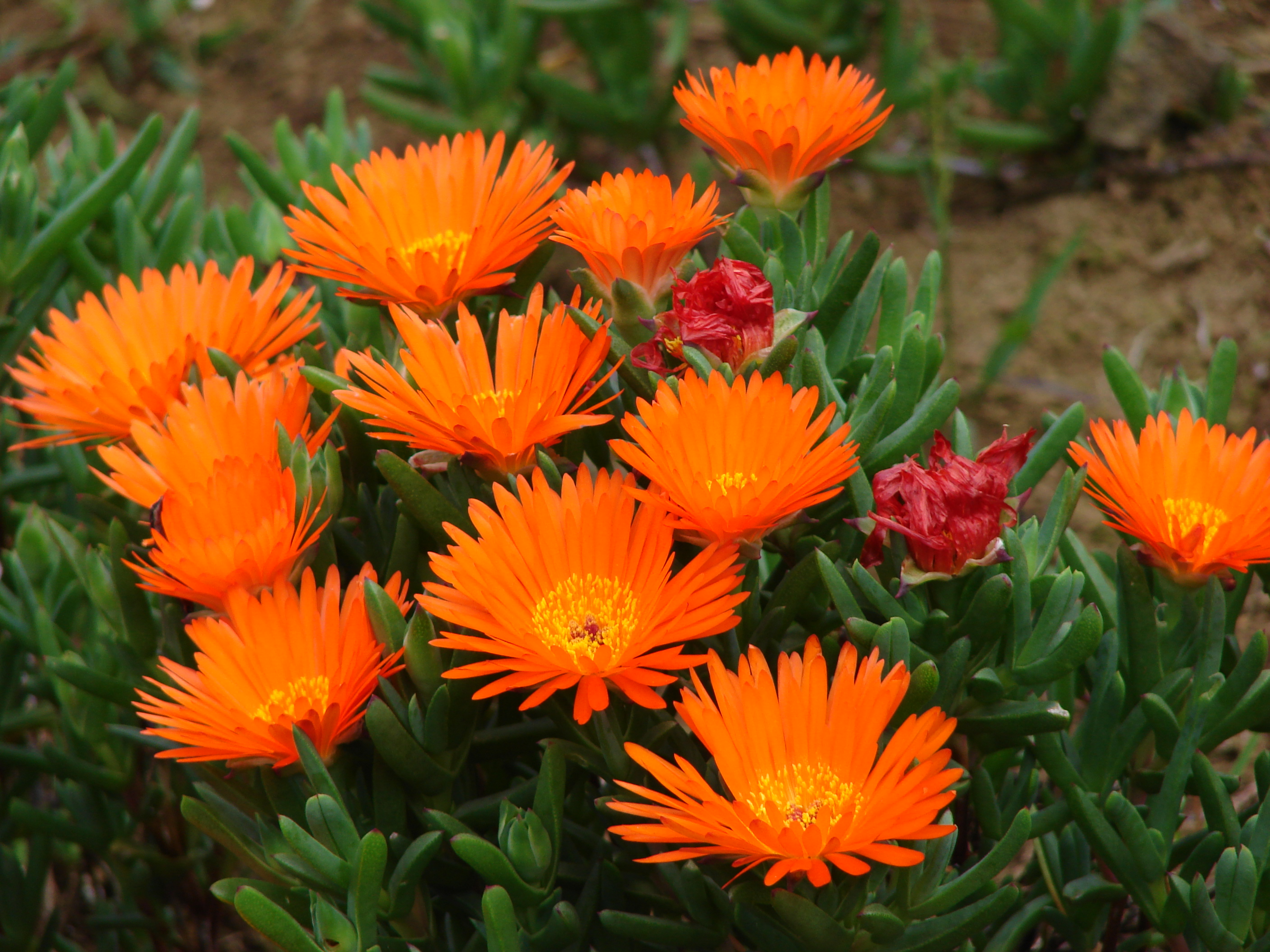
Typical flower and leaf shape of genus

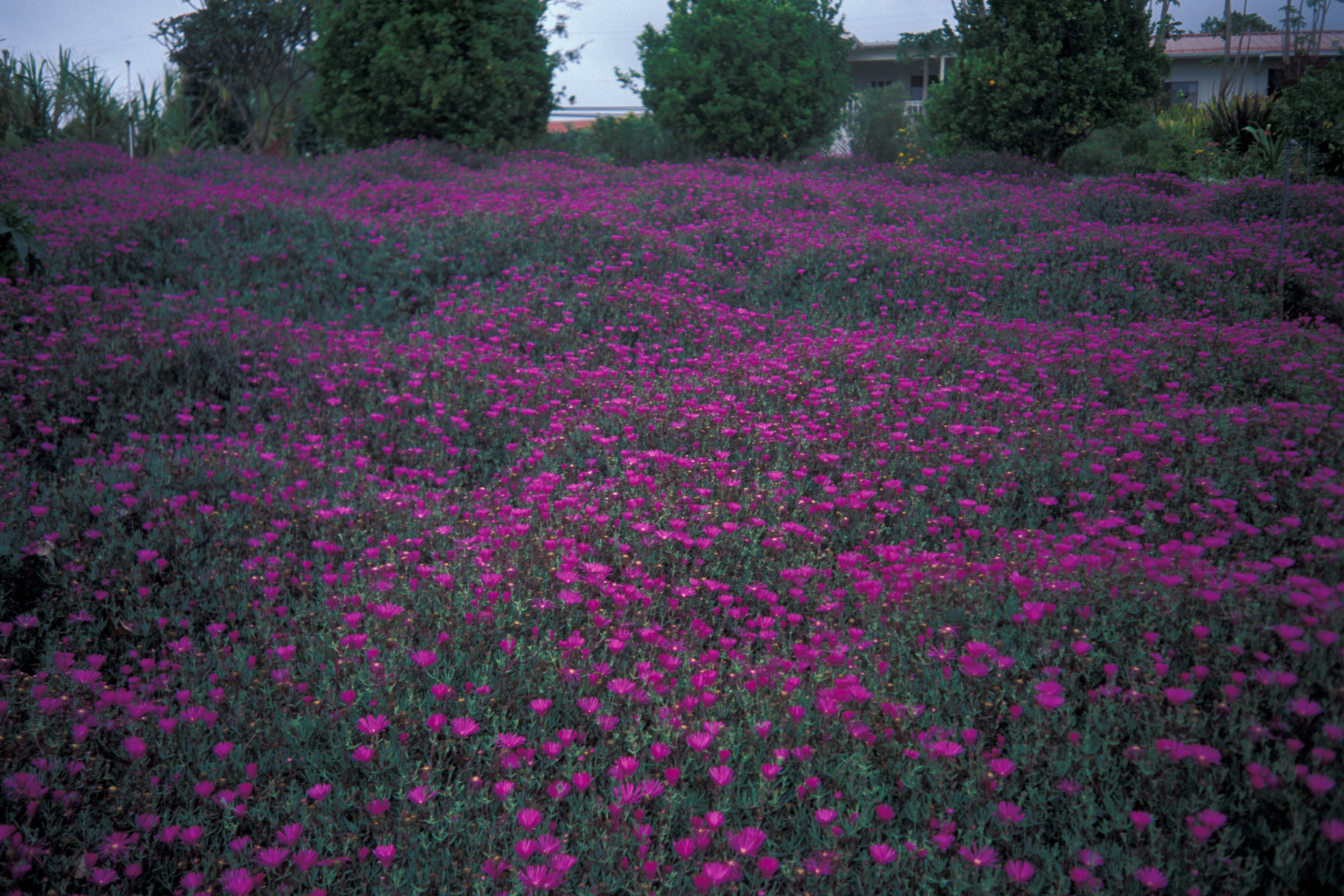
A field of Lampranthus multiradiatus (the "mini ice plant")

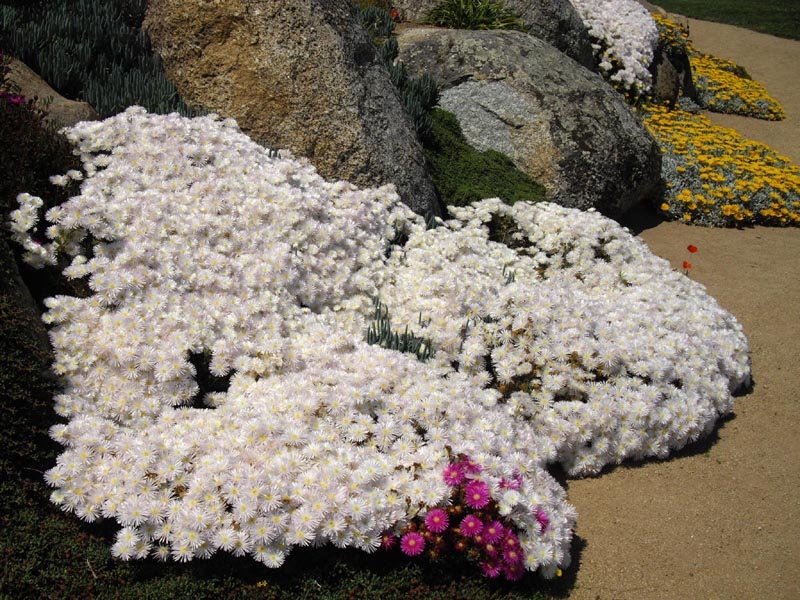

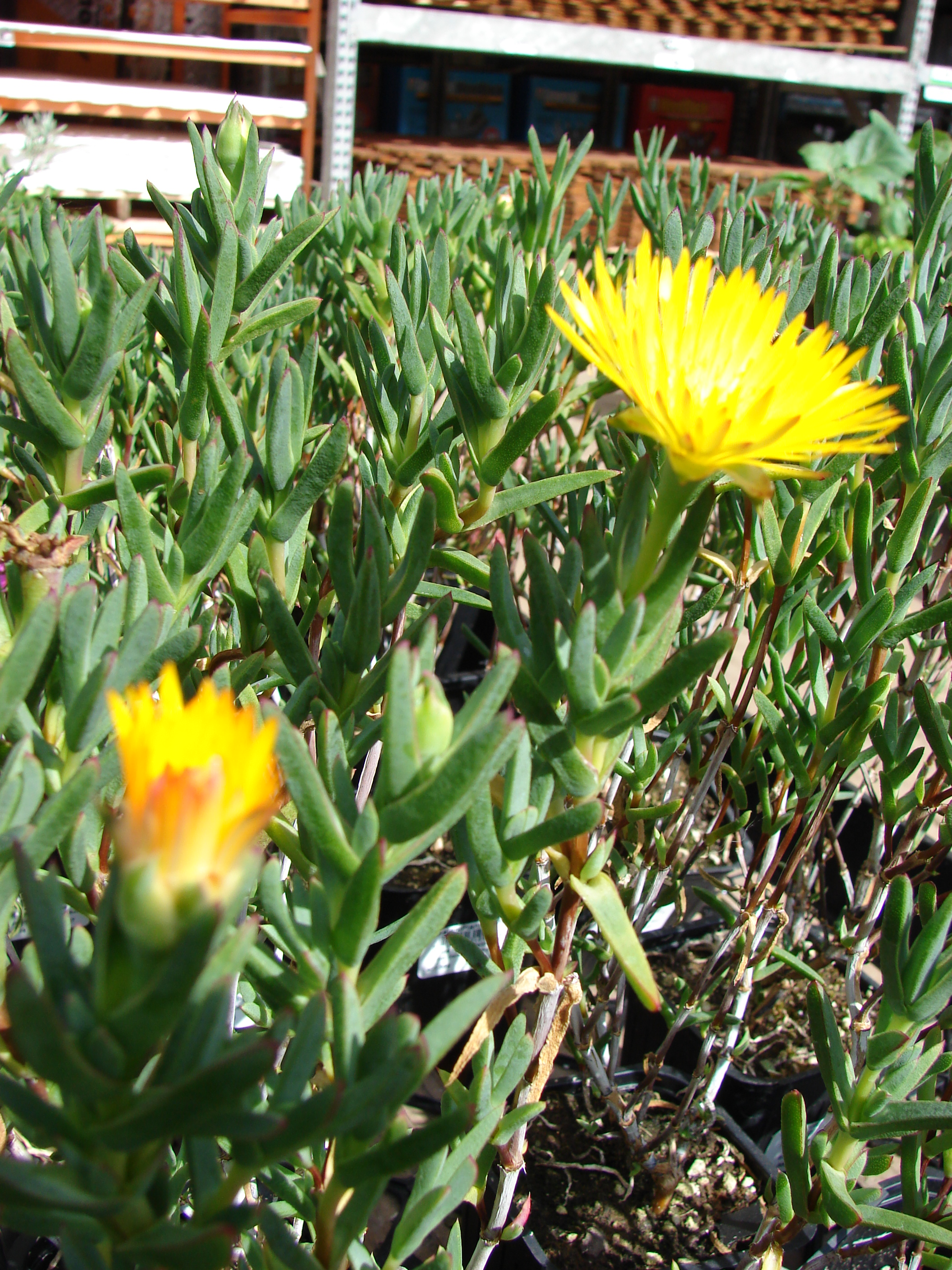

All Lampranthus species flower between June and August (in the Northern Hemisphere) with flower colours including red, orange, peach, yellow and light pink through to magenta and purple. They are pollinated by many insects, such as bees, wasps and beetles.

== Species ==
As of January 2024, Plants of the World Online accepted the following species:

- Lampranthus acutifolius (L.Bolus) N.E.Br.
- Lampranthus aduncus (Haw.) N.E.Br.
- Lampranthus affinis L.Bolus
- Lampranthus alboroseus Klak
- Lampranthus antonii L.Bolus
- Lampranthus arenarius H.E.K.Hartmann
- Lampranthus arenicola L.Bolus
- Lampranthus aureus (L.) N.E.Br.
- Lampranthus bicolor (L.) N.E.Br.
- Lampranthus borealis L.Bolus
- Lampranthus brachyandrus (L.Bolus) N.E.Br.
- Lampranthus brownii (Hook.f.) N.E.Br.
- Lampranthus caudatus L.Bolus
- Lampranthus ceriseus (L.Bolus) L.Bolus
- Lampranthus coccineus (Haw.) N.E.Br.
- Lampranthus conspicuus (Haw.) N.E.Br.
- Lampranthus convexus (L.Bolus) L.Bolus
- Lampranthus coralliflorus (Salm-Dyck) N.E.Br.
- Lampranthus curviflorus (Haw.) H.E.K.Hartmann
- Lampranthus debilis (Haw.) N.E.Br.
- Lampranthus deflexus (Aiton) N.E.Br.
- Lampranthus densifolius (L.Bolus) L.Bolus
- Lampranthus densipetalus (L.Bolus) L.Bolus
- Lampranthus diffusus (L.Bolus) N.E.Br.
- Lampranthus disgregus N.E.Br.
- Lampranthus diutinus (L.Bolus) N.E.Br.
- Lampranthus dregeanus (Sond.) N.E.Br.
- Lampranthus dubitans (L.Bolus) L.Bolus
- Lampranthus dulcis (L.Bolus) L.Bolus
- Lampranthus dyckii (A.Berger) N.E.Br.
- Lampranthus edwardsiae (L.Bolus) L.Bolus
- Lampranthus elegans (Jacq.) Schwantes
- Lampranthus emarginatoides (Haw.) N.E.Br.
- Lampranthus emarginatus (L.) N.E.Br.
- Lampranthus erratus N.E.Br.
- Lampranthus esterhuyseniae L.Bolus
- Lampranthus explanatus (L.Bolus) N.E.Br.
- Lampranthus falcatus (L.) N.E.Br.
- Lampranthus falciformis (Haw.) N.E.Br.
- Lampranthus fergusoniae L.Bolus
- Lampranthus filicaulis (Haw.) N.E.Br.
- Lampranthus flexifolius (Haw.) N.E.Br.
- Lampranthus flexilis (Haw.) N.E.Br.
- Lampranthus foliosus L.Bolus
- Lampranthus formosus (Haw.) N.E.Br.
- Lampranthus francesiae H.E.K.Hartmann
- Lampranthus fugitans L.Bolus
- Lampranthus glaucoides (Haw.) N.E.Br.
- Lampranthus glaucus (L.) N.E.Br.
- Lampranthus glomeratus (L.) N.E.Br.
- Lampranthus godmaniae (L.Bolus) L.Bolus
- Lampranthus haworthii (Donn ex Haw.) N.E.Br.
- Lampranthus hiemalis (L.Bolus) L.Bolus
- Lampranthus hoerleinianus (Dinter) Friedrich
- Lampranthus holensis L.Bolus
- Lampranthus imbricans (Haw.) N.E.Br.
- Lampranthus intervallaris L.Bolus
- Lampranthus laetus (L.Bolus) L.Bolus
- Lampranthus lavisii (L.Bolus) L.Bolus
- Lampranthus laxifolius (L.Bolus) N.E.Br.
- Lampranthus leipoldtii (L.Bolus) L.Bolus
- Lampranthus leptaleon (Haw.) N.E.Br.
- Lampranthus leptosepalus (L.Bolus) L.Bolus
- Lampranthus lewisiae (L.Bolus) L.Bolus
- Lampranthus liberalis (L.Bolus) L.Bolus
- Lampranthus littlewoodii L.Bolus
- Lampranthus marginatus (L.Bolus) H.E.K.Hartmann
- Lampranthus mariae (L.Bolus) L.Bolus
- Lampranthus montaguensis (L.Bolus) L.Bolus
- Lampranthus multiradiatus (Jacq.) N.E.Br.
- Lampranthus multiseriatus (L.Bolus) N.E.Br.
- Lampranthus mutatus (G.D.Rowley) H.E.K.Hartmann
- Lampranthus nardouwensis (L.Bolus) L.Bolus
- Lampranthus otzenianus (Dinter) Friedrich
- Lampranthus pakhuisensis (L.Bolus) L.Bolus
- Lampranthus pakpassensis H.E.K.Hartmann
- Lampranthus pauciflorus (L.Bolus) N.E.Br.
- Lampranthus paucifolius (L.Bolus) N.E.Br.
- Lampranthus peacockiae (L.Bolus) L.Bolus
- Lampranthus peersii (L.Bolus) N.E.Br.
- Lampranthus perreptans L.Bolus
- Lampranthus plautus N.E.Br.
- Lampranthus pleniflorus L.Bolus
- Lampranthus pocockiae (L.Bolus) N.E.Br.
- Lampranthus polyanthon (Haw.) N.E.Br.
- Lampranthus praecipitatus (L.Bolus) L.Bolus
- Lampranthus procumbens Klak
- Lampranthus productus (Haw.) N.E.Br.
- Lampranthus profundus (L.Bolus) H.E.K.Hartmann
- Lampranthus promontorii (L.Bolus) N.E.Br.
- Lampranthus proximus L.Bolus
- Lampranthus purpureus L.Bolus
- Lampranthus reptans (Aiton) N.E.Br.
- Lampranthus rupestris (L.Bolus) N.E.Br.
- Lampranthus scaber (L.) N.E.Br.
- Lampranthus schlechteri (Zahlbr.) L.Bolus
- Lampranthus sociorum (L.Bolus) N.E.Br.
- Lampranthus sparsiflorus L.Bolus
- Lampranthus spectabilis (Haw.) N.E.Br.
- Lampranthus spiniformis (Haw.) N.E.Br.
- Lampranthus staminodiosus Schwantes
- Lampranthus stanfordiae L.Bolus
- Lampranthus stayneri (L.Bolus) N.E.Br.
- Lampranthus stenopetalus (L.Bolus) N.E.Br.
- Lampranthus stenus (Haw.) N.E.Br.
- Lampranthus stephanii (Schwantes) Schwantes
- Lampranthus stipulaceus (L.) N.E.Br.
- Lampranthus suavissimus L.Bolus
- Lampranthus sublaxus L.Bolus
- Lampranthus subrotundus L.Bolus
- Lampranthus swartbergensis (L.Bolus) N.E.Br.
- Lampranthus swartkopensis Strohschn.
- Lampranthus tenuifolius (L.) N.E.Br.
- Lampranthus turbinatus (Jacq.) N.E.Br.
- Lampranthus uniflorus (L.Bolus) L.Bolus
- Lampranthus vanheerdei L.Bolus
- Lampranthus vanzijliae (L.Bolus) N.E.Br.
- Lampranthus verecundus (L.Bolus) N.E.Br.
- Lampranthus vernalis (L.Bolus) L.Bolus
- Lampranthus violaceus (DC.) Schwantes
- Lampranthus watermeyeri (L.Bolus) N.E.Br.
- Lampranthus zeyheri (Salm-Dyck) N.E.Br.

== Distribution ==
These plants are mainly found in Southern Africa, especially in arid areas, such as the Fynbos habitats.

== Phytochemistry ==
L. aureus and L. spectabilis contain mesembrenol and low levels of related alkaloids such as mesembrenone and have sometimes been mismarketed as kanna (Mesembryanthemum tortuosum) extract which contains higher levels of related alkaloids.

== Gallery ==
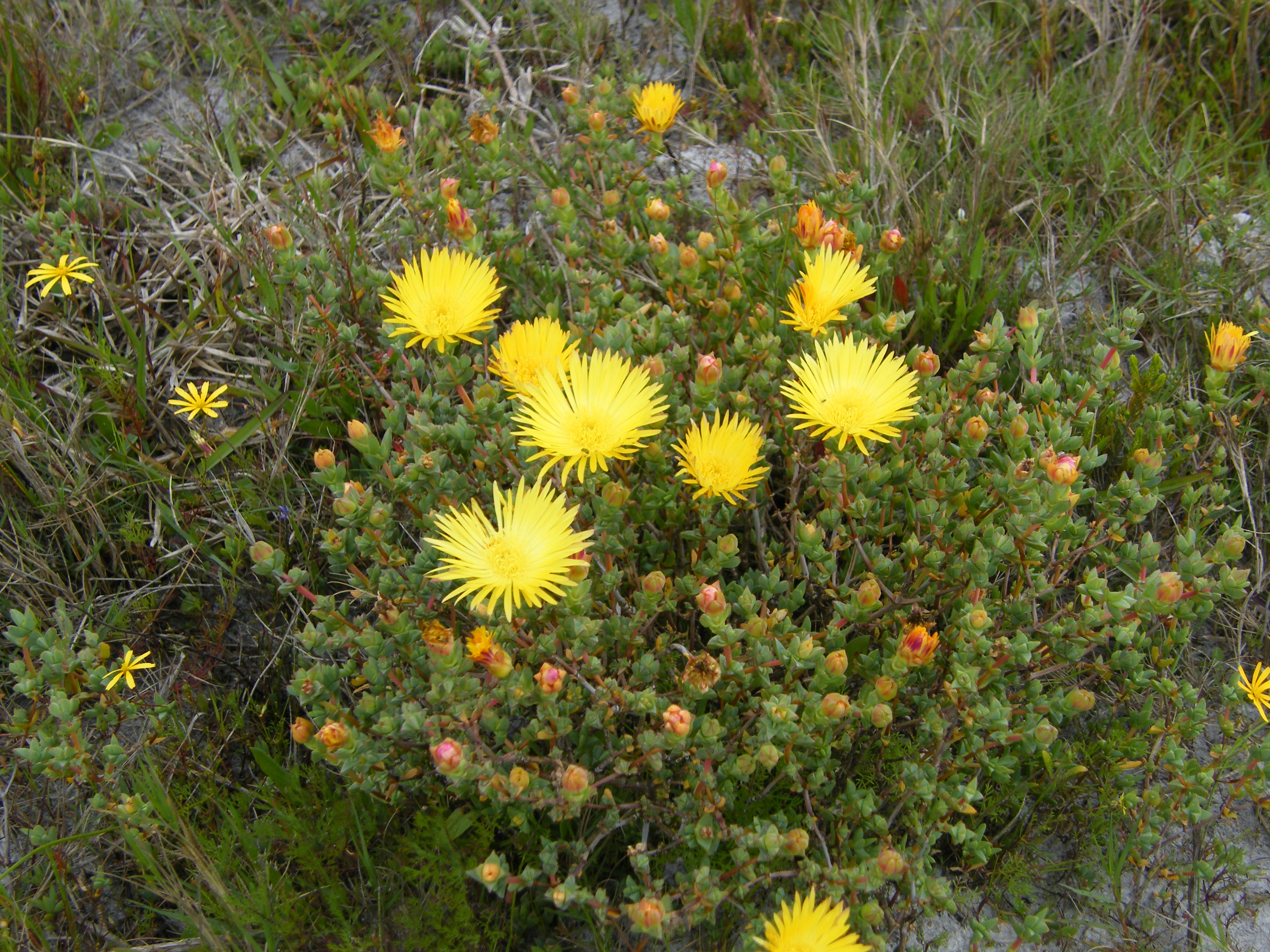
Lampranthus glaucus

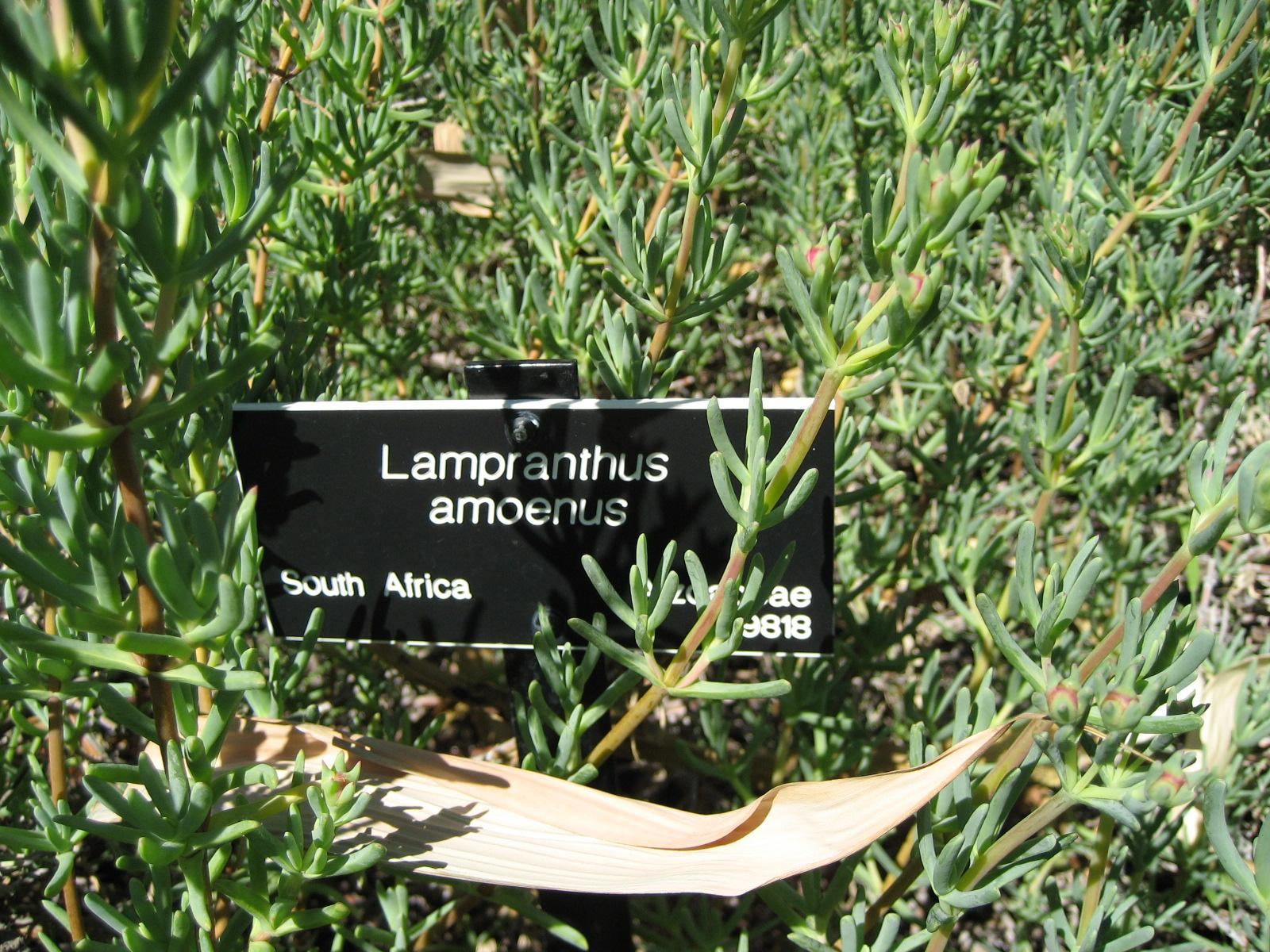
Typical cylindrical leaves of Lampranthus stipulaceus

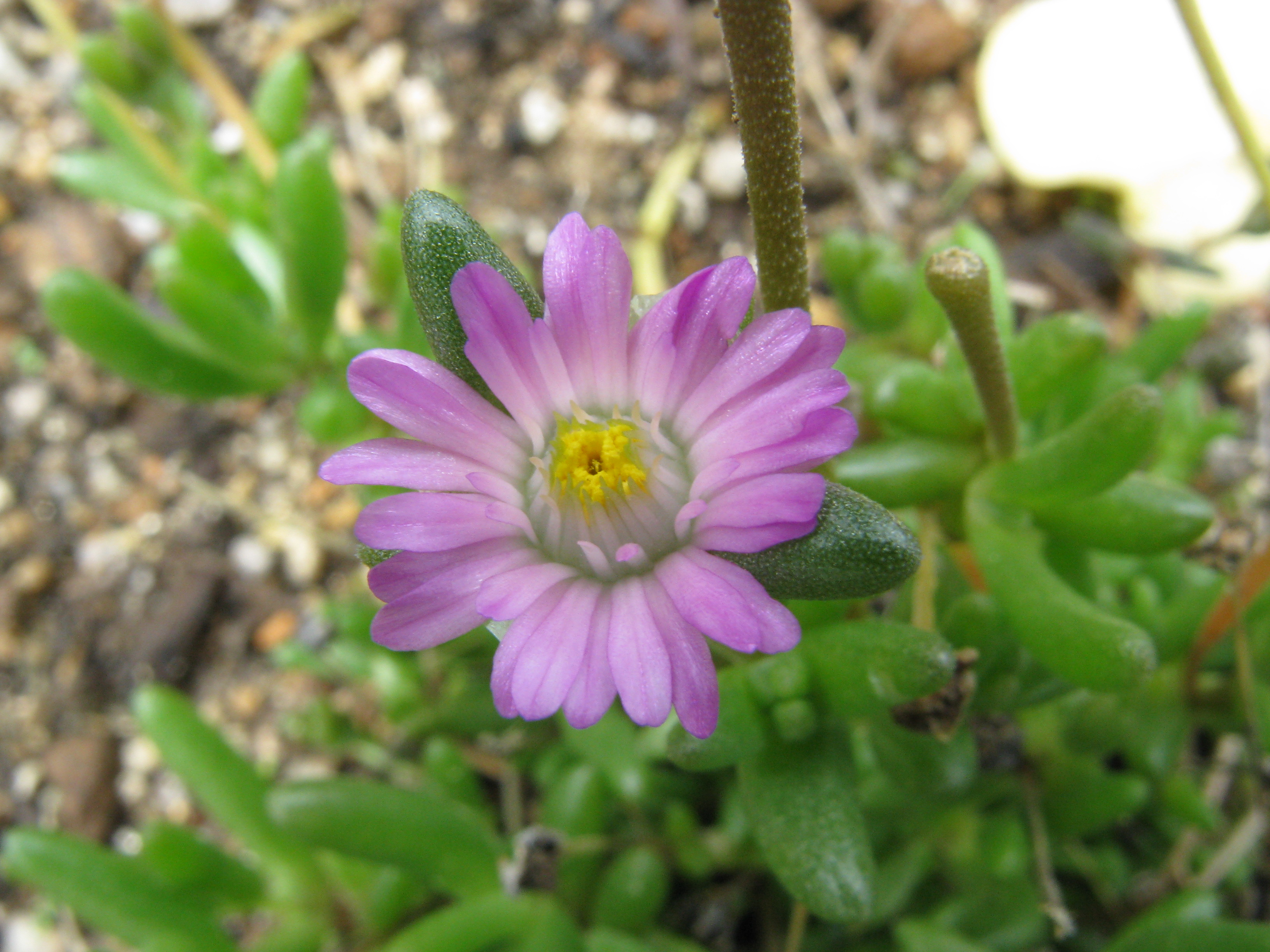
The tiny species Lampranthus tenuifolius

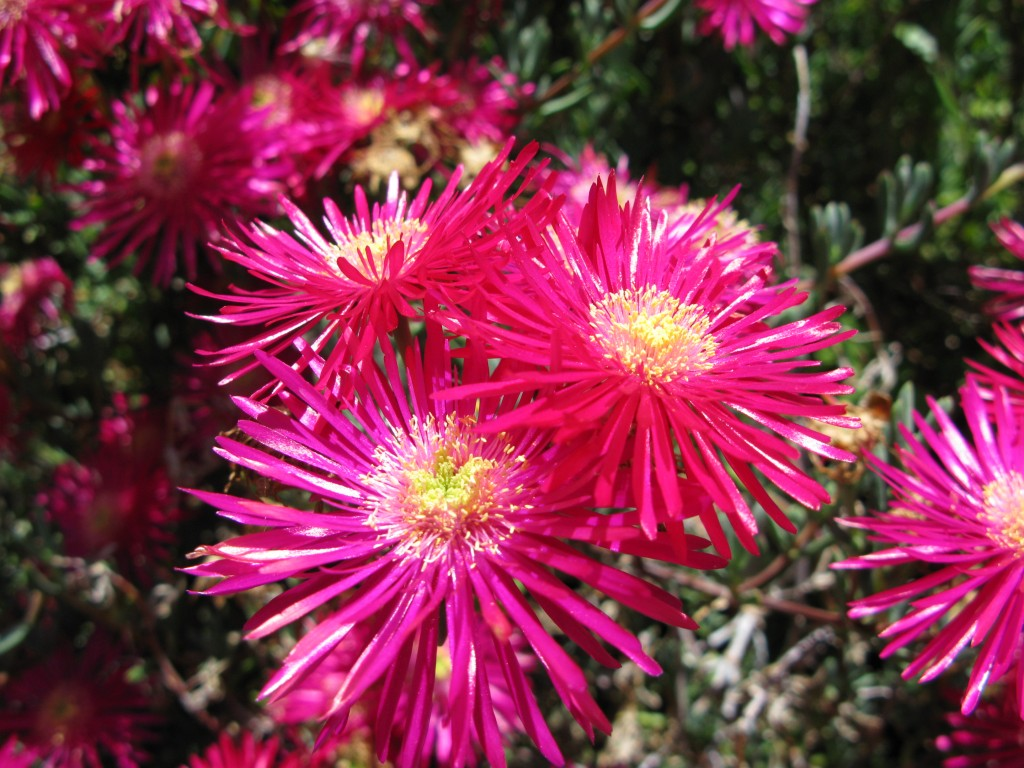
Lampranthus zeyheri
