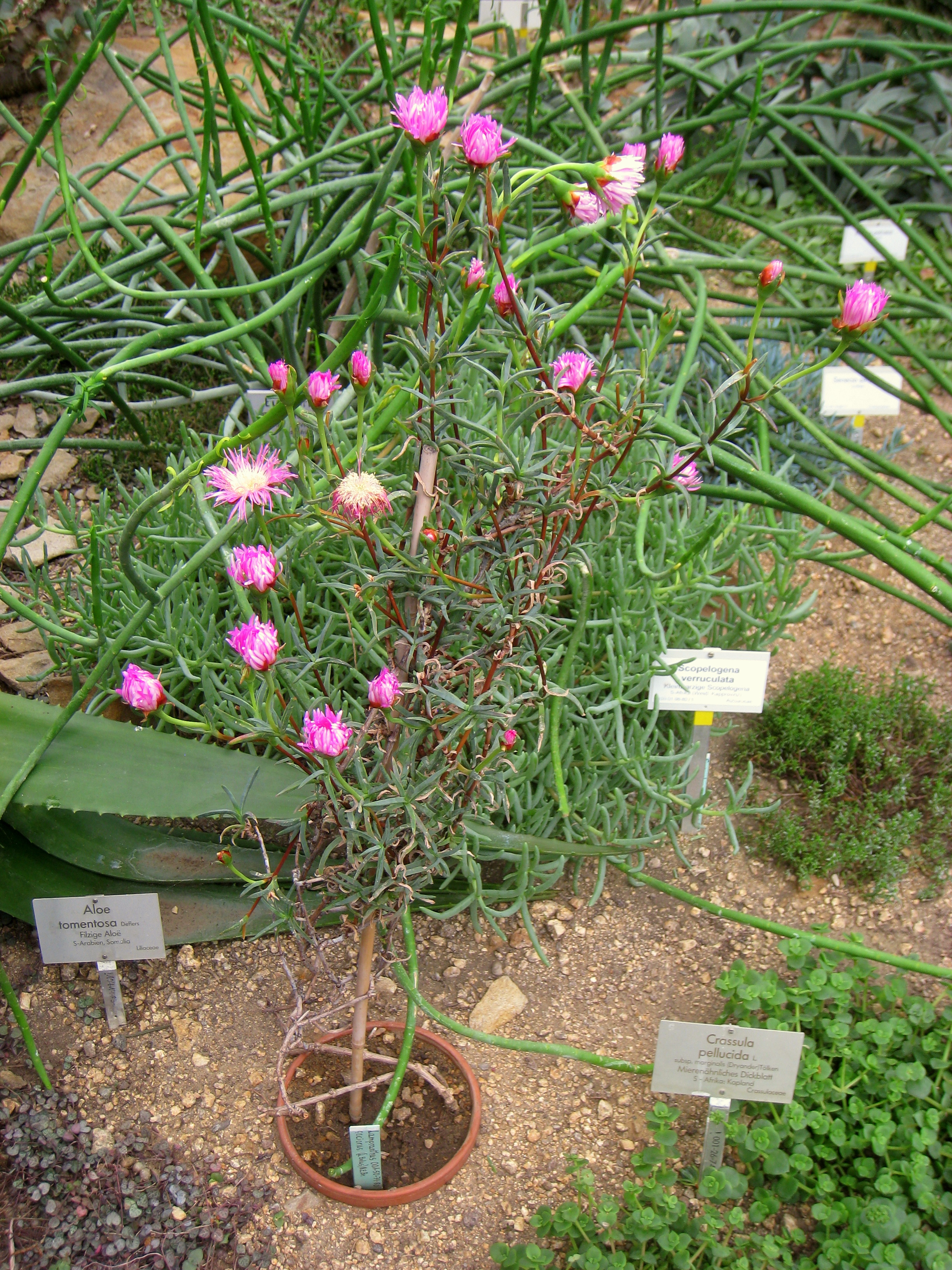

Scientific classification
- Kingdom: Plantae
- Clade: Tracheophytes
- Clade: Angiosperms
- Clade: Eudicots
- Order: Caryophyllales
- Family: Aizoaceae
- Genus: Lampranthus
- Species: L. sociorum

Binomial name
- Lampranthus sociorum (L.Bolus) N.E.Br.

Synonyms
- Mesembryanthemum sociorum L.Bolus

= Lampranthus sociorum =

Species of succulent

Lampranthus sociorum is a species of plants in the family Aizoaceae.

== Synonym ==
- Mesembryanthemum sociorum L.Bolus
