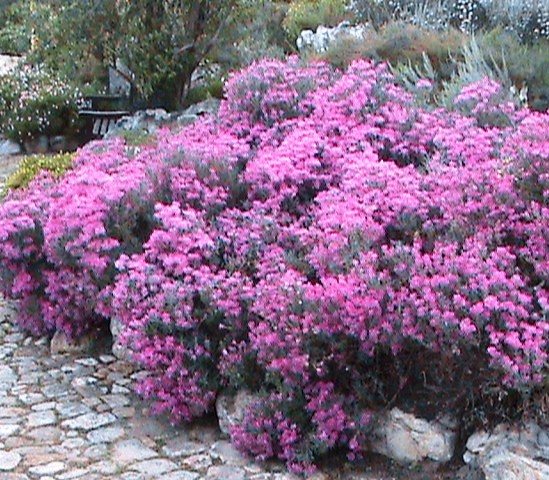

Scientific classification
- Kingdom: Plantae
- Clade: Tracheophytes
- Clade: Angiosperms
- Clade: Eudicots
- Order: Caryophyllales
- Family: Aizoaceae
- Genus: Lampranthus
- Species: L. stipulaceus

Binomial name
- Lampranthus stipulaceus (L.) N.E.Br.

Synonyms
- Erepsia stipulacea (L.) Schwantes; Lampranthus amoenus (Salm-Dyck ex DC.) N.E.Br.; Mesembryanthemum amoenum Salm-Dyck ex DC.; Mesembryanthemum bracteatum Willd.; Mesembryanthemum stipulaceum L.

= Lampranthus stipulaceus =

Species of succulent

Lampranthus stipulaceus is a succulent belonging to the genus Lampranthus. The species is endemic to the Western Cape, and the population is stable.
