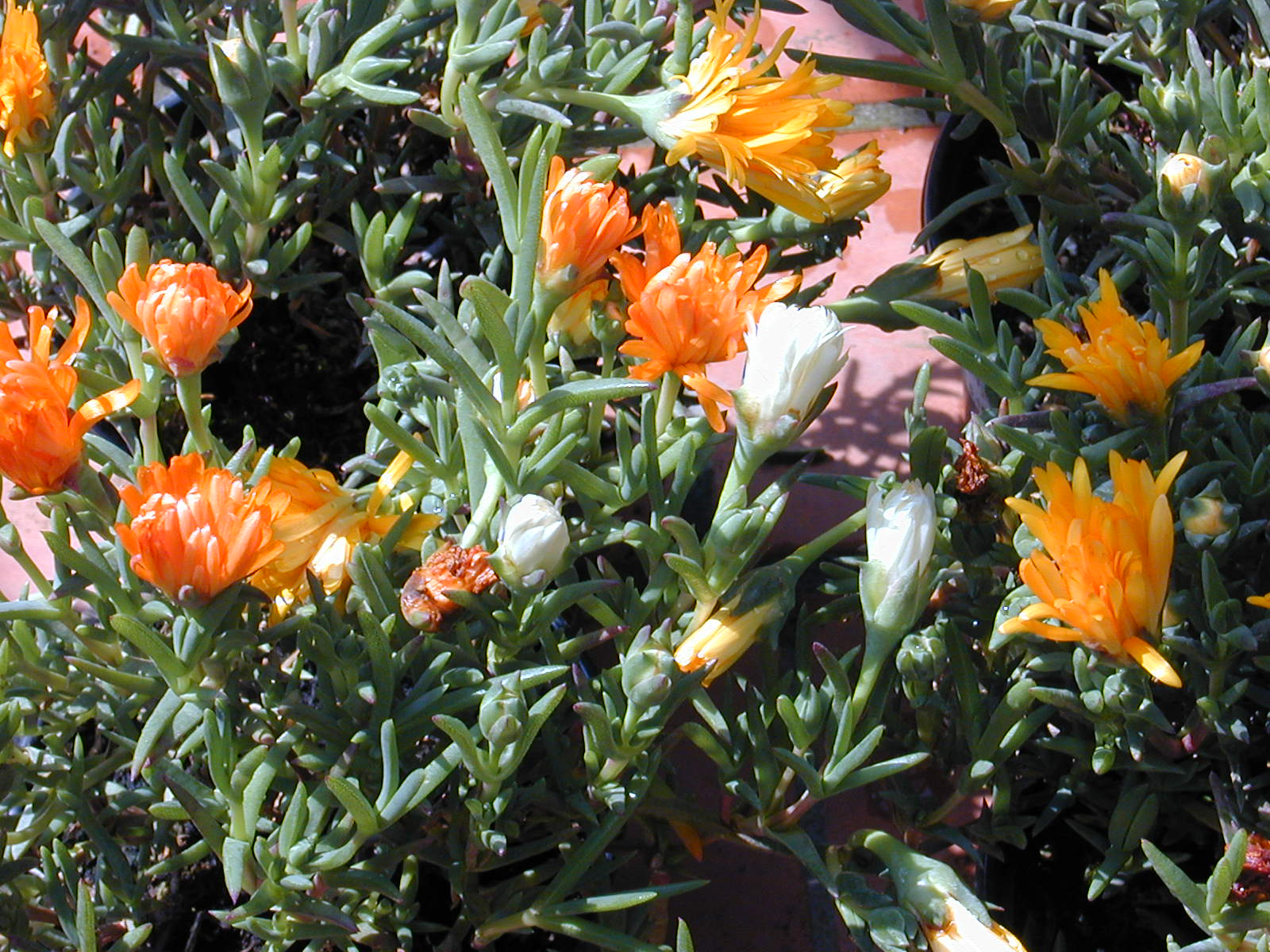

Scientific classification
- Kingdom: Plantae
- Clade: Tracheophytes
- Clade: Angiosperms
- Clade: Eudicots
- Order: Caryophyllales
- Family: Aizoaceae
- Genus: Lampranthus
- Species: L. glaucoides

Binomial name
- Lampranthus glaucoides (Haw.) N.E.Br.

Synonyms
- Lampranthus aurantium Schwantes, nom. superfl.; Lampranthus aurantiacus (DC.) Schwantes; Lampranthus hurlingii (L.Bolus) L.Bolus; Lampranthus marcidulus N.E.Br.; Lampranthus matutinus (L.Bolus) N.E.Br.; Mesembryanthemum aurantiacum DC., orth. var.; Mesembryanthemum aurantium Haw., nom. superfl.; Mesembryanthemum flaccidum L.Bolus, nom. illeg.; Mesembryanthemum glaucoides Haw.; Mesembryanthemum hurlingii L.Bolus; Mesembryanthemum matutinum L.Bolus

= Lampranthus glaucoides =

Species of succulent

Lampranthus glaucoides, synonyms including Lampranthus aurantiacus, known as the trailing iceplant (a name it shares with other members of its family Aizoaceae) and copper brightfig, is a plant species in the genus Lampranthus native to South Africa and naturalized in gardens all around the world. It was first described by Adrian Hardy Haworth in 1795 as Mesembryanthemum glaucoides.

The orange color of the petals is due to the presence of the betaxanthin humilixanthin.

Lampranthus glaucoides (as Lampranthus aurantiacus) is included in the Tasmanian Fire Service's list of low flammability plants, indicating that it is suitable for growing within a building protection zone.
