= Lampranthus dulcis =

Scientific classification
- Kingdom: Plantae
- Clade: Tracheophytes
- Clade: Angiosperms
- Clade: Eudicots
- Order: Caryophyllales
- Family: Aizoaceae
- Genus: Lampranthus
- Species: L. dulcis

Binomial name
- Lampranthus dulcis (L.Bolus) L.Bolus

Synonyms
- Lampranthus berghiae (L.Bolus) L.Bolus; Lampranthus leightoniae (L.Bolus) L.Bolus; Lampranthus martleyi (L.Bolus) L.Bolus; Lampranthus plenus (L.Bolus) L.Bolus; Lampranthus subtruncatus L.Bolus; Mesembryanthemum berghiae L.Bolus; Mesembryanthemum dulce L.Bolus; Mesembryanthemum leightoniae L.Bolus; Mesembryanthemum martleyi L.Bolus; Mesembryanthemum plenum L.Bolus

Species of succulent

Lampranthus dulcis is a succulent plant belonging to the genus Lampranthus. The species is endemic to the Western Cape.
