= Lampranthus hoerleinianus =

Scientific classification
- Kingdom: Plantae
- Clade: Tracheophytes
- Clade: Angiosperms
- Clade: Eudicots
- Order: Caryophyllales
- Family: Aizoaceae
- Genus: Lampranthus
- Species: L. hoerleinianus

Binomial name
- Lampranthus hoerleinianus (Dinter) Friedrich

Synonyms
- Mesembryanthemum hoerleinianum Dinter

Species of succulent

Lampranthus hoerleinianus, commonly known as the purple vygie or persvygie, is a succulent plant belonging to the genus Lampranthus. The species is native to Namibia and the Northern Cape.
