= Trailing iceplant =

Trailing iceplant or trailing ice plant may refer to the following plant species:

- Delosperma cooperi
- Lampranthus glaucoides, syn. Lampranthus aurantiacus
- Lampranthus aureus
- Lampranthus spectabilis
- Lampranthus zeyheri
