= Lampranthus watermeyeri =

Scientific classification
- Kingdom: Plantae
- Clade: Tracheophytes
- Clade: Angiosperms
- Clade: Eudicots
- Order: Caryophyllales
- Family: Aizoaceae
- Genus: Lampranthus
- Species: L. watermeyeri

Binomial name
- Lampranthus watermeyeri (L.Bolus) N.E.Br.

Synonyms
- Lampranthus saturatus (L.Bolus) N.E.Br.; Lampranthus vanputtenii (L.Bolus) N.E.Br.; Mesembryanthemum saturatum L.Bolus; Mesembryanthemum vanputtenii L.Bolus; Mesembryanthemum watermeyeri L.Bolus

Species of succulent

Lampranthus watermeyeri, also commonly known as the olifants brightfig, is a succulent belonging to the genus Lampranthus. The species is endemic to the Northern Cape and forms part of the fynbos.
