= Lampranthus haworthii =

Scientific classification
- Kingdom: Plantae
- Clade: Tracheophytes
- Clade: Angiosperms
- Clade: Eudicots
- Order: Caryophyllales
- Family: Aizoaceae
- Genus: Lampranthus
- Species: L. haworthii

Binomial name
- Lampranthus haworthii (Donn ex Haw.) N.E.Br.

Synonyms
- Erepsia haworthii (Donn ex Haw.) Schwantes; Erepsia cyathiformis (L.Bolus) Schwantes; Lampranthus cyathiformis (L.Bolus) N.E.Br.; Lampranthus egregius (L.Bolus) L.Bolus; Mesembryanthemum cyathiforme L.Bolus; Mesembryanthemum egregium L.Bolus; Mesembryanthemum haworthii Donn ex Haw.

Species of succulent

Lampranthus haworthii, commonly known as the purple brightfig, purple vygie, donkie vygie, or Haworth's ice plant, is a succulent plant belonging to the genus Lampranthus. The species is endemic to the Western Cape.
