= Lampranthus promontorii =

Scientific classification
- Kingdom: Plantae
- Clade: Tracheophytes
- Clade: Angiosperms
- Clade: Eudicots
- Order: Caryophyllales
- Family: Aizoaceae
- Genus: Lampranthus
- Species: L. promontorii

Binomial name
- Lampranthus promontorii (L.Bolus) N.E.Br.

Synonyms
- Mesembryanthemum promontorii L.Bolus

Species of succulent

Lampranthus promontorii is a succulent belonging to the genus Lampranthus. The species is endemic to the Western Cape and occurs in the southern part of the Cape Peninsula. The plant has an extent of occurrence of less than 300 km² and is part of the fynbos vegetation. It falls under the protection of Table Mountain National Park and is considered rare.
