= Lampranthus leipoldtii =

Scientific classification
- Kingdom: Plantae
- Clade: Tracheophytes
- Clade: Angiosperms
- Clade: Eudicots
- Order: Caryophyllales
- Family: Aizoaceae
- Genus: Lampranthus
- Species: L. leipoldtii

Binomial name
- Lampranthus leipoldtii (L.Bolus) L.Bolus

Synonyms
- Mesembryanthemum leipoldtii L.Bolus

Species of succulent

Lampranthus leipoldtii is a succulent plant belonging to the genus Lampranthus. The species is endemic to the Western Cape.
