= Lampranthus schlechteri =

Scientific classification
- Kingdom: Plantae
- Clade: Tracheophytes
- Clade: Angiosperms
- Clade: Eudicots
- Order: Caryophyllales
- Family: Aizoaceae
- Genus: Lampranthus
- Species: L. schlechteri

Binomial name
- Lampranthus schlechteri (Zahlbr.) L.Bolus

Synonyms
- Lampranthus perspicuus (A.Berger) N.E.Br.; Mesembryanthemum perspicuum A.Berger; Mesembryanthemum sabulosum Schltr.; Mesembryanthemum schlechteri Zahlbr.

Species of succulent

Lampranthus schlechteri is a succulent belonging to the genus Lampranthus. The species is endemic to the Western Cape and occurs from Wemmershoek to Stellenbosch. The plant has already lost 95% of its habitat to suburban development, the establishment of vineyards, and the planting of plantations. Fewer than 250 plants remain; at one time, the plant was considered extinct. It is part of the fynbos biome.
