= Lampranthus brownii =

Scientific classification
- Kingdom: Plantae
- Clade: Tracheophytes
- Clade: Angiosperms
- Clade: Eudicots
- Order: Caryophyllales
- Family: Aizoaceae
- Genus: Lampranthus
- Species: L. brownii

Binomial name
- Lampranthus brownii (Hook.f.) N.E.Br.

Synonyms
- Mesembryanthemum brownii Hook.f.

Species of succulent

Lampranthus brownii, commonly known as Brown's shining flower, is a succulent plant belonging to the genus Lampranthus. The species is endemic to the Western Cape.
