= Lampranthus falcatus =

Scientific classification
- Kingdom: Plantae
- Clade: Tracheophytes
- Clade: Angiosperms
- Clade: Eudicots
- Order: Caryophyllales
- Family: Aizoaceae
- Genus: Lampranthus
- Species: L. falcatus

Binomial name
- Lampranthus falcatus (L.) N.E.Br.

Synonyms
- Lampranthus candidus L.Bolus; Lampranthus capillaceus (L.Bolus) N.E.Br.; Lampranthus framesii (L.Bolus) N.E.Br.; Lampranthus middlemostii (L.Bolus) L.Bolus; Lampranthus tulbaghensis (A.Berger) N.E.Br.; Lampranthus vallis-gratiae (Schltr. & A.Berger) N.E.Br.; Mesembryanthemum capillaceum L.Bolus; Mesembryanthemum falcatum L.; Mesembryanthemum framesii L.Bolus; Mesembryanthemum middlemostii L.Bolus; Mesembryanthemum tulbaghense A.Berger; Mesembryanthemum vallis-gratiae Schltr. & A.Berger

Species of succulent

Lampranthus falcatus, commonly known as the sickle brightfig, is a succulent belonging to the genus Lampranthus. The species is endemic to the Western Cape and forms part of the fynbos. It occurs from Tulbagh to Worcester and the Langeberg.
