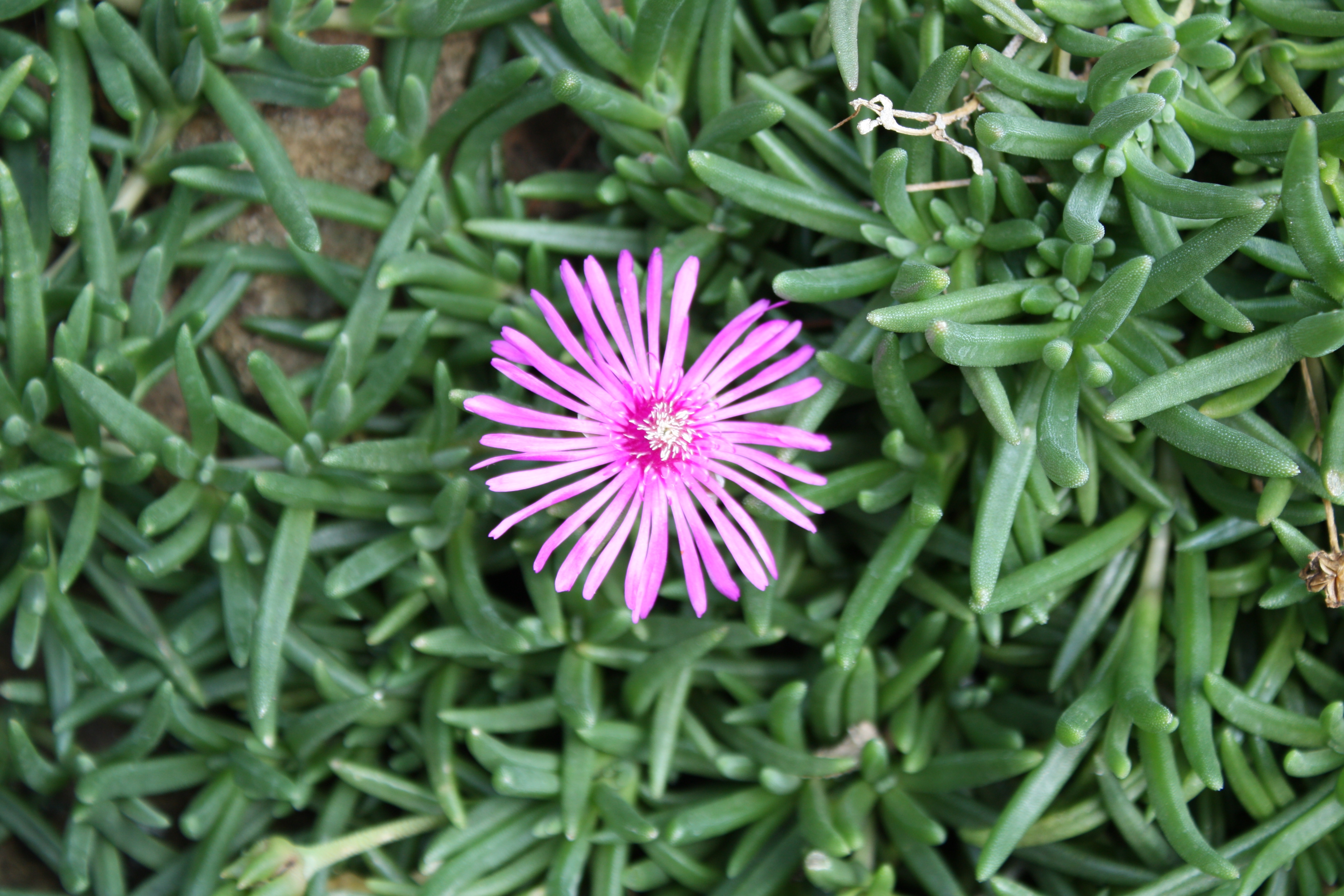
- Flower and leaves
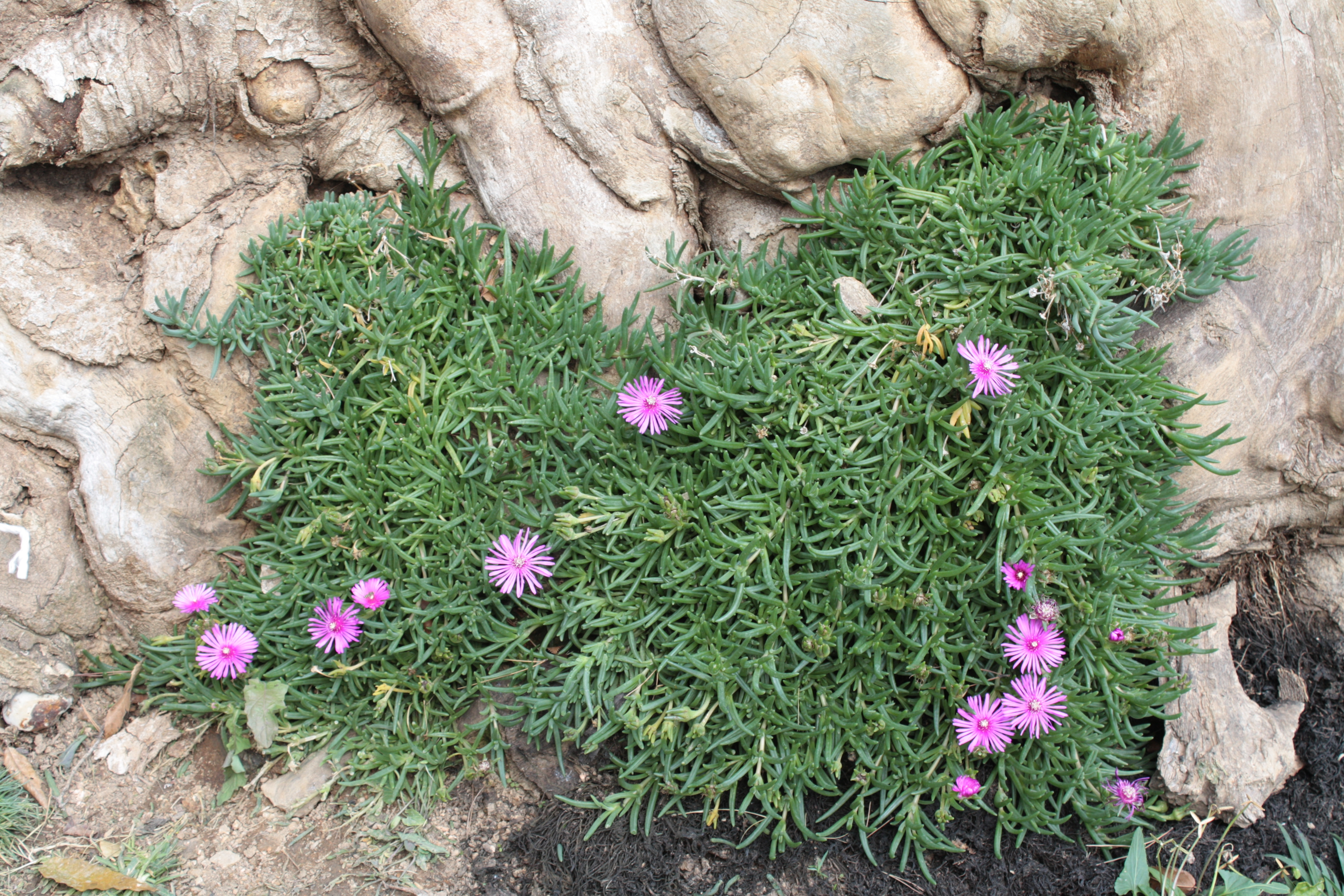
- Habit

Scientific classification
- Kingdom: Plantae
- Clade: Embryophytes
- Clade: Tracheophytes
- Clade: Angiosperms
- Clade: Eudicots
- Order: Caryophyllales
- Family: Aizoaceae
- Genus: Lampranthus
- Species: L. spectabilis

Binomial name
- Lampranthus spectabilis (Haw.) N.E.Br.

Synonyms
- Lampranthus macrocarpus (A.Berger) N.E.Br.; Lampranthus macrosepalus (L.Bolus) L.Bolus; Mesembryanthemum macrocarpum A.Berger; Mesembryanthemum macrosepalum L.Bolus; Mesembryanthemum spectabile Haw.

= Lampranthus spectabilis =

Species of flowering plant

Lampranthus spectabilis, the trailing iceplant (a name it shares with other members of its family), is a species of flowering plant in the family Aizoaceae, native to the Cape Provinces of South Africa. The unimproved species and a number of cultivars are commercially available, including 'Tresco Apricot', 'Tresco Brilliant', 'Tresco Fire', 'Tresco Orange', 'Tresco Peach', 'Tresco Pearl', 'Tresco Purple', and 'Tresco Red'.

== Phytochemistry ==
L. spectabilis contains mesembrenol and low levels of related alkaloids such as mesembrenone and have sometimes been mismarketed as Kanna (Sceletium tortuosum) extract which contains higher levels of related alkaloids.
