= Agulhas Plain =

Region on the southern tip of Africa

Coordinates: 34°38′20″S 19°51′00″E

Designations

Ramsar Wetland
- Official name: Agulhas Plain
- Designated: 2 February 2026
- Reference no.: 2587

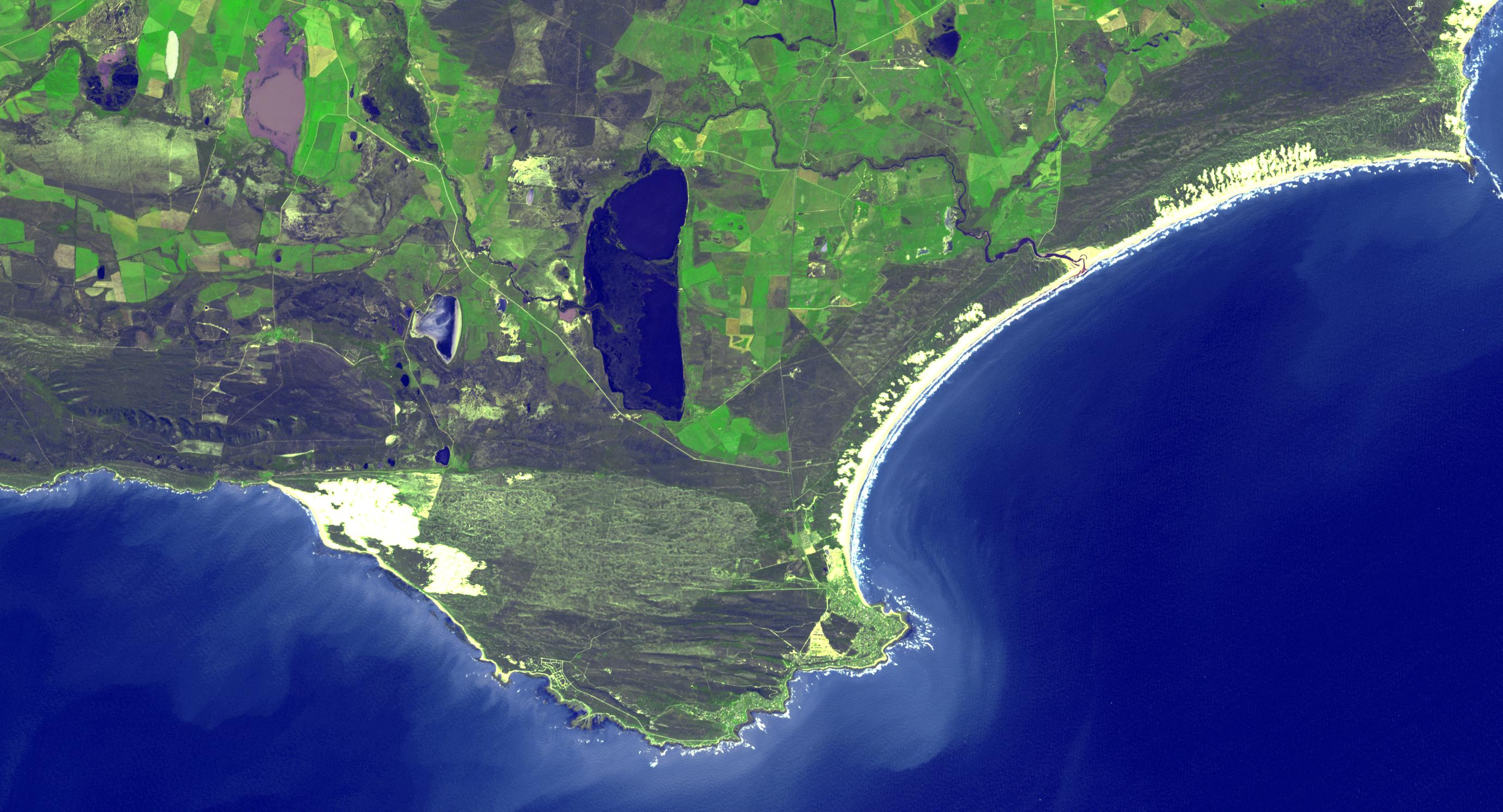

The Agulhas Plain is a complex wetland system located in the Overberg at the southern tip of Africa. It begins north of Bredasdorp, and extends to the southern tip of Cape Agulhas. The western boundary is near Gansbaai. The area has been designated as a protected Ramsar site since 2026.

There are many endangered plant species in the area. Many of these are not found in the state forests and private nature reserves along the coastal areas, but grow more inland.

== Flora ==
A new fynbos lily species, the New Year's lily (Cyrtanthus novus-annus), was discovered in a conservation area on the Agulhas Plain and the species Hermannia concinnifolia is endemic to the plain.

== Paleo-Agulhas Plain ==
The now submerged Paleo-Agulhas Plain in South Africa had diverse, green ecosystems and abundant wildlife for early humans.
