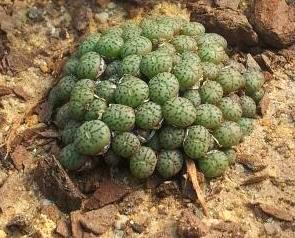
- Witteberg variety

Conservation status
- Endangered (IUCN 3.1)
- CITES Appendix III

Scientific classification
- Kingdom: Plantae
- Clade: Embryophytes
- Clade: Tracheophytes
- Clade: Spermatophytes
- Clade: Angiosperms
- Clade: Eudicots
- Order: Caryophyllales
- Family: Aizoaceae
- Genus: Conophytum
- Species: C. minimum

Binomial name
- Conophytum minimum (Thunb.) N.E.Br.

= Conophytum minimum =

Species of succulent

Conophytum minimum is a small South African species of succulent plant of the genus Conophytum.

== Description ==
Small, highly patterned, mat-forming succulent, with a flattened (truncated) or slightly convex, rounded body-shape.

It is covered with distinctive lines, and the wittebergense variety has especially strong markings.

It is closely related to its neighbouring species Conophytum joubertii, Conophytum ficiforme, Conophytum piluliforme, and to the widespread Conophytum truncatum.

== Distribution and habitat ==
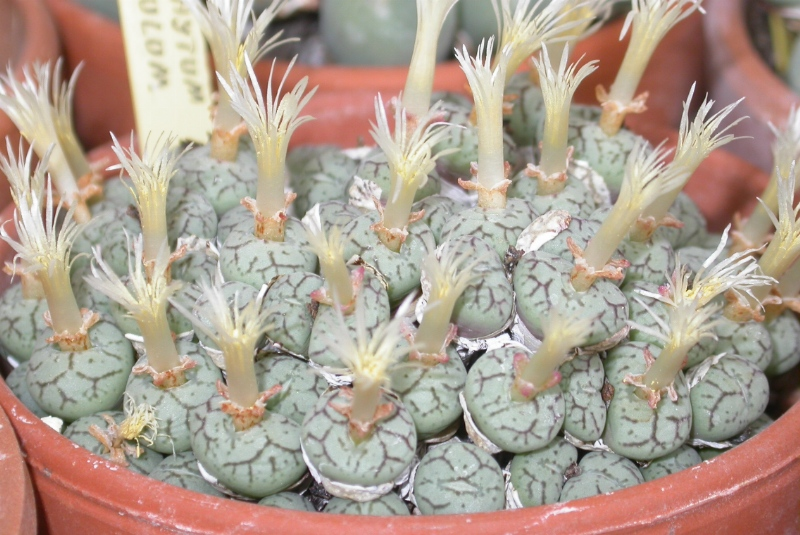
Conophytum minimum having flowered.

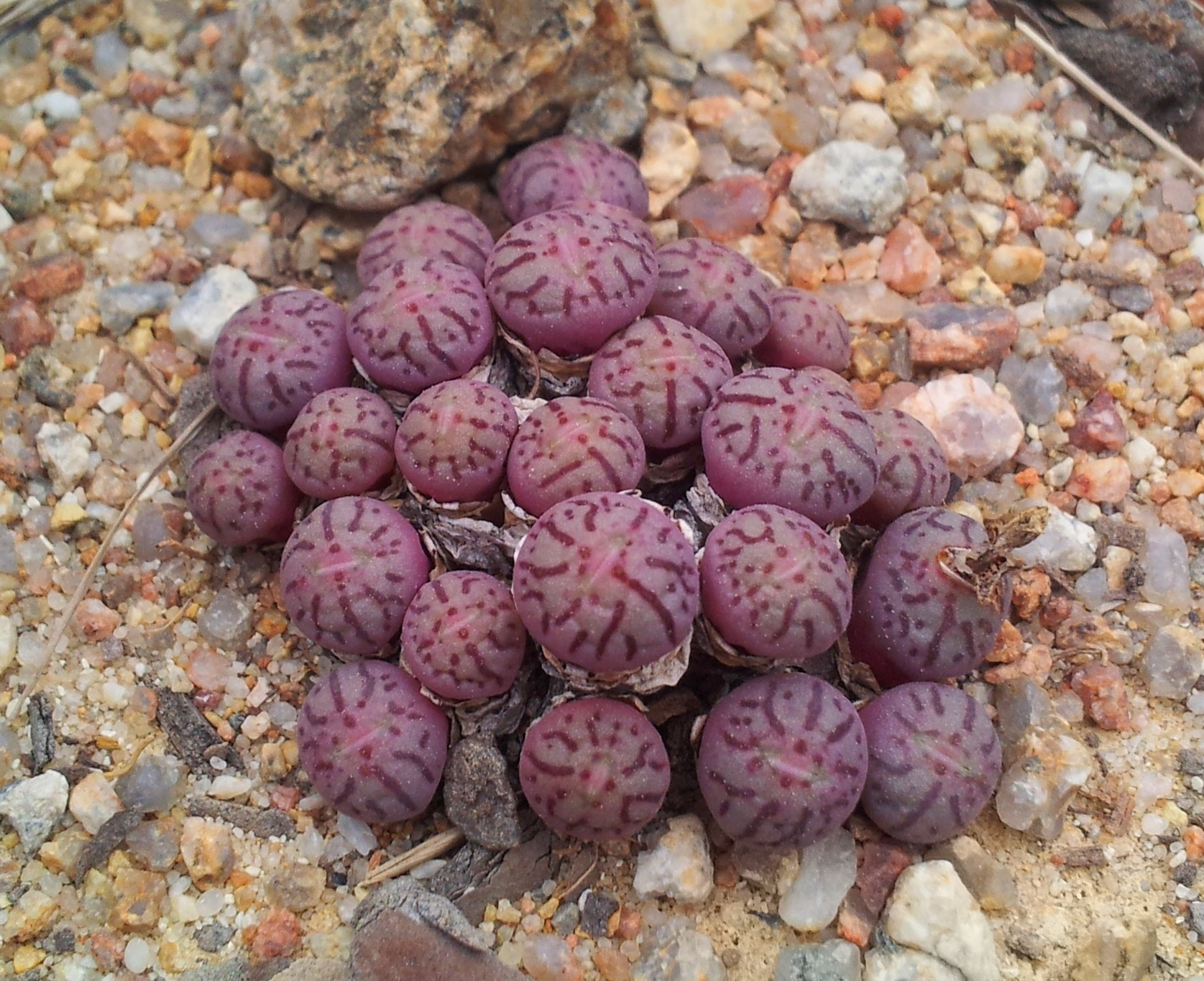
Conophytum minimum from Laingsburg.

This species is indigenous to the far south-western corner of the Great Karoo region, in the Western Cape of South Africa, in the Ceres Karoo and around Laingsburg.

They grow primarily in the winter, when rainfall swells them. After flowering, they go into dormancy through the summer, when they are covered in a dry papery sheath. They inhabit extremely well-drained soil, in spots protected by rocks or bushes. They split and crack if they receive too much water.
