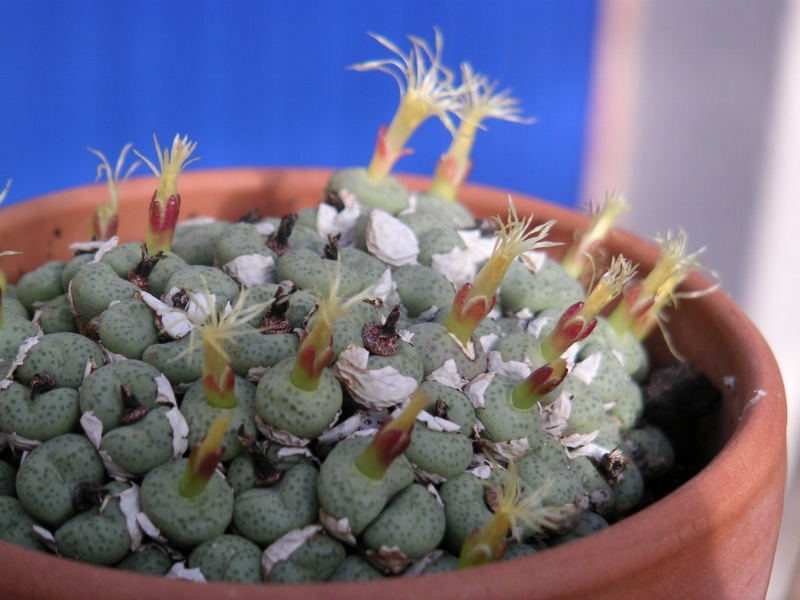

Conservation status
- Endangered (IUCN 3.1)
- CITES Appendix III

Scientific classification
- Kingdom: Plantae
- Clade: Embryophytes
- Clade: Tracheophytes
- Clade: Spermatophytes
- Clade: Angiosperms
- Clade: Eudicots
- Order: Caryophyllales
- Family: Aizoaceae
- Genus: Conophytum
- Species: C. truncatum

Binomial name
- Conophytum truncatum (Thunb.) N.E.Br.

= Conophytum truncatum =

Species of succulent

Conophytum truncatum is a small South African species of succulent plant of the genus Conophytum.

== Description ==
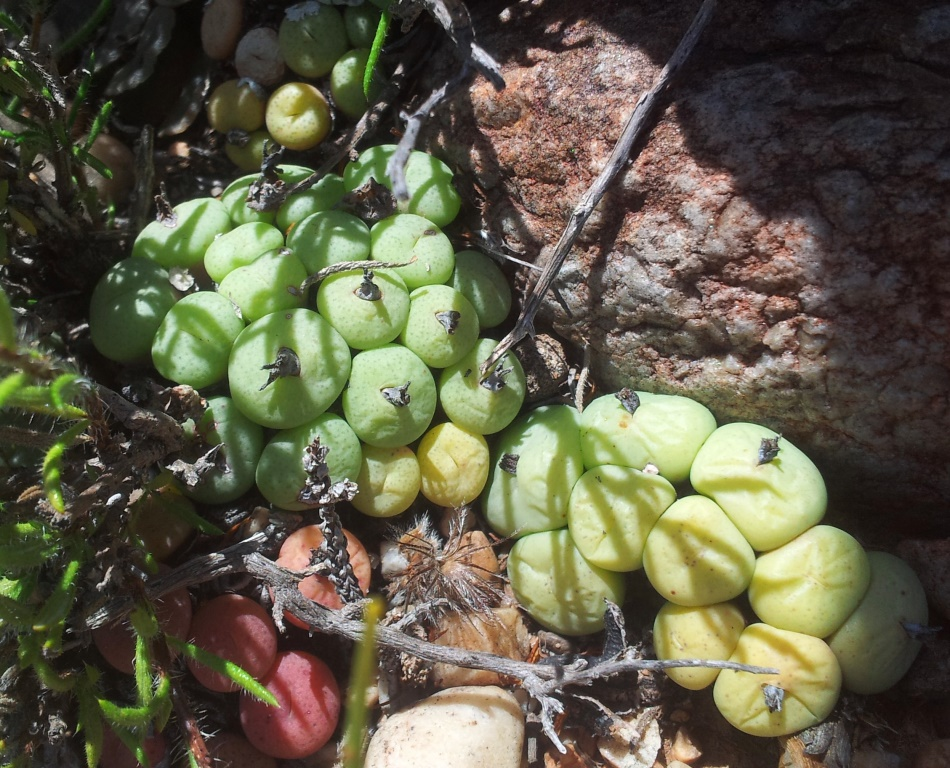
C. truncatum in habitat near Oudtshoorn.

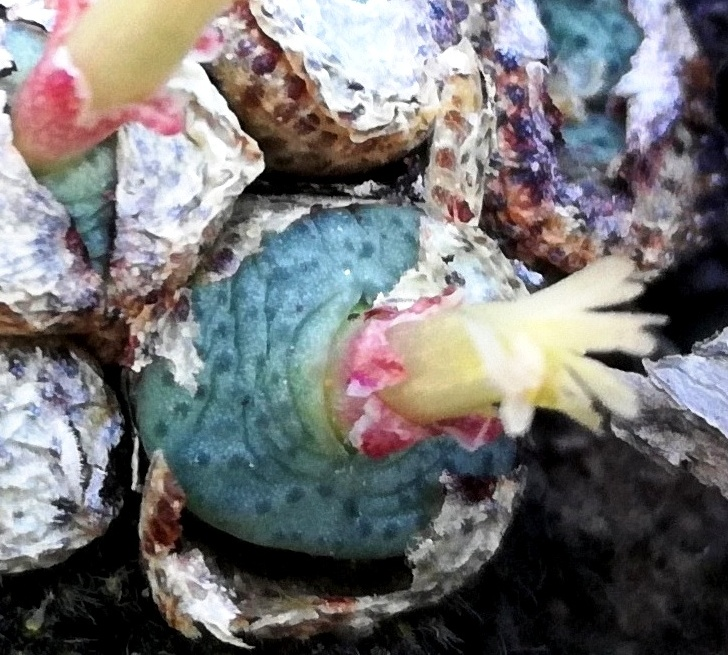
Detail of Conophytum truncatum flowering head. Touwsrivier

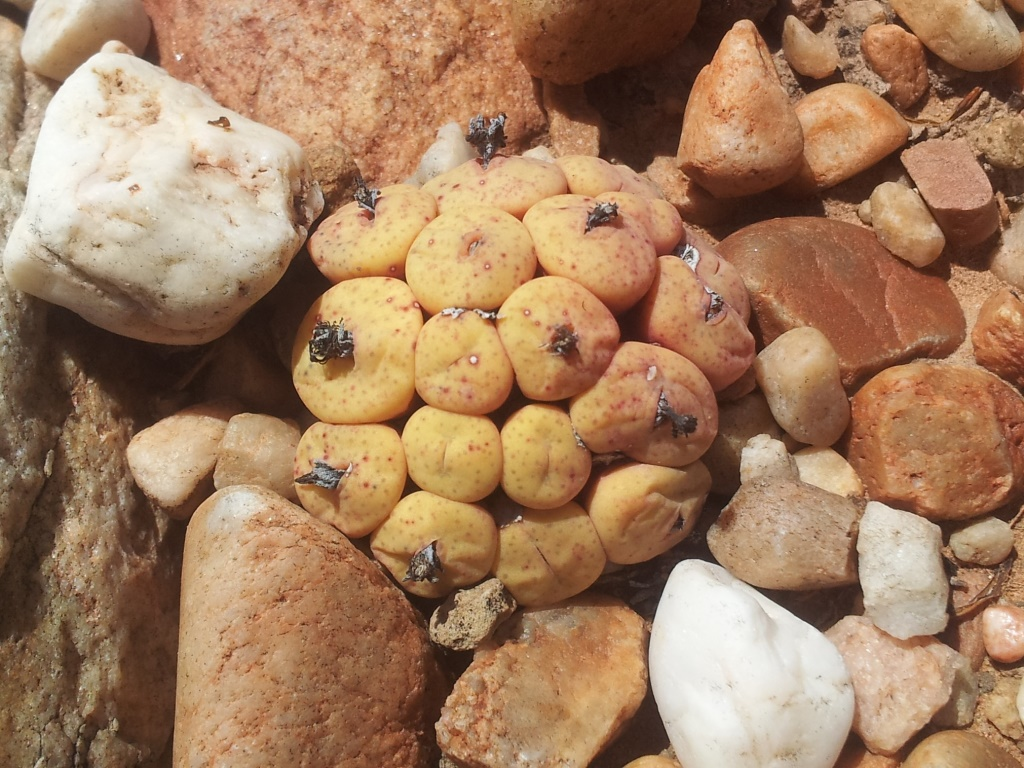
C. truncatum in habitat near Oudtshoorn.

Conophytum truncatum can be distinguished from its closest relatives by its truncated, flattened heads, with small fissures. It is a very variable species. Some population have spots – sometimes arranged into vague lines; others have no markings.

The flowers are usually a pale yellow.

=== Relatives and distinguishing features ===
Conophytum truncatum is closely related to several neighbouring species to the west: Conophytum minimum, white-flowered Conophytum joubertii, purple-flowered Conophytum piluliforme of the Montagu area, and Conophytum ficiforme of the Breede River Valley.

The rare Conophytum joubertii (restricted to the Ladismith-Vanwyksdorp area) has small (less than 5 mm x 5 mm), more rounded, convex or cylindrical shaped heads, and has cream or white flowers.

The common Conophytum piluliforme (occurring across the Montagu-Ladismith Karoo) has small (less than 5 mm x 5 mm), obconical, "pill-shaped" ("piluliforme") heads, with few or no spots and pink or purple flowers.

The Conophytum ficiforme (restricted to the Breede River valley) has raised, keeled, "fig-shaped" bodies, with distinctive spots that are clearly arranged in angular, (horseshoe-shaped) lines over their heads. This species also has pink or purple flowers.

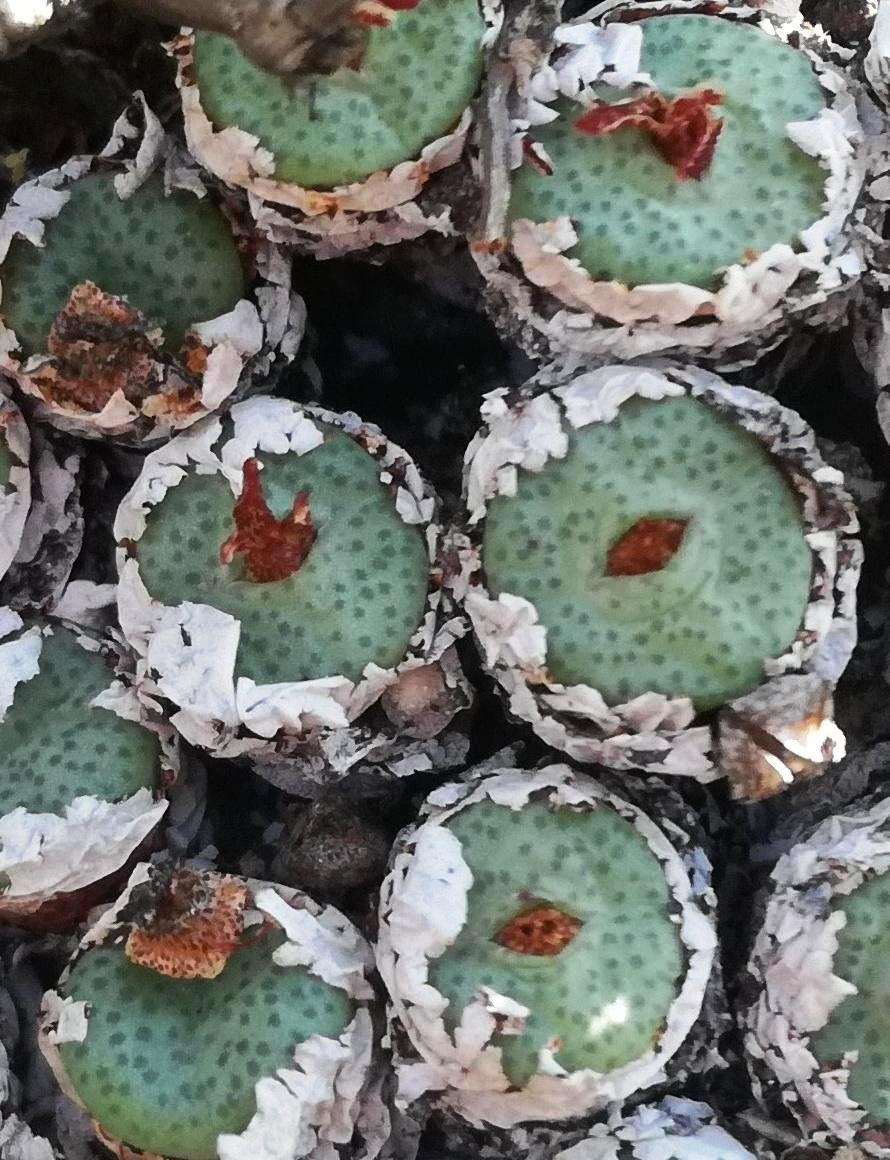
Typical flat, "truncated" heads of Conophytum truncatum

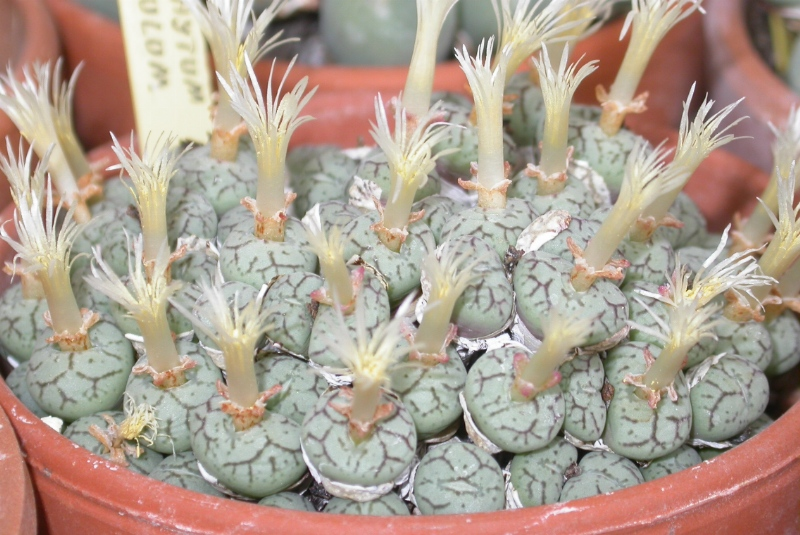
Typical, strongly-marked heads of Conophytum minimum

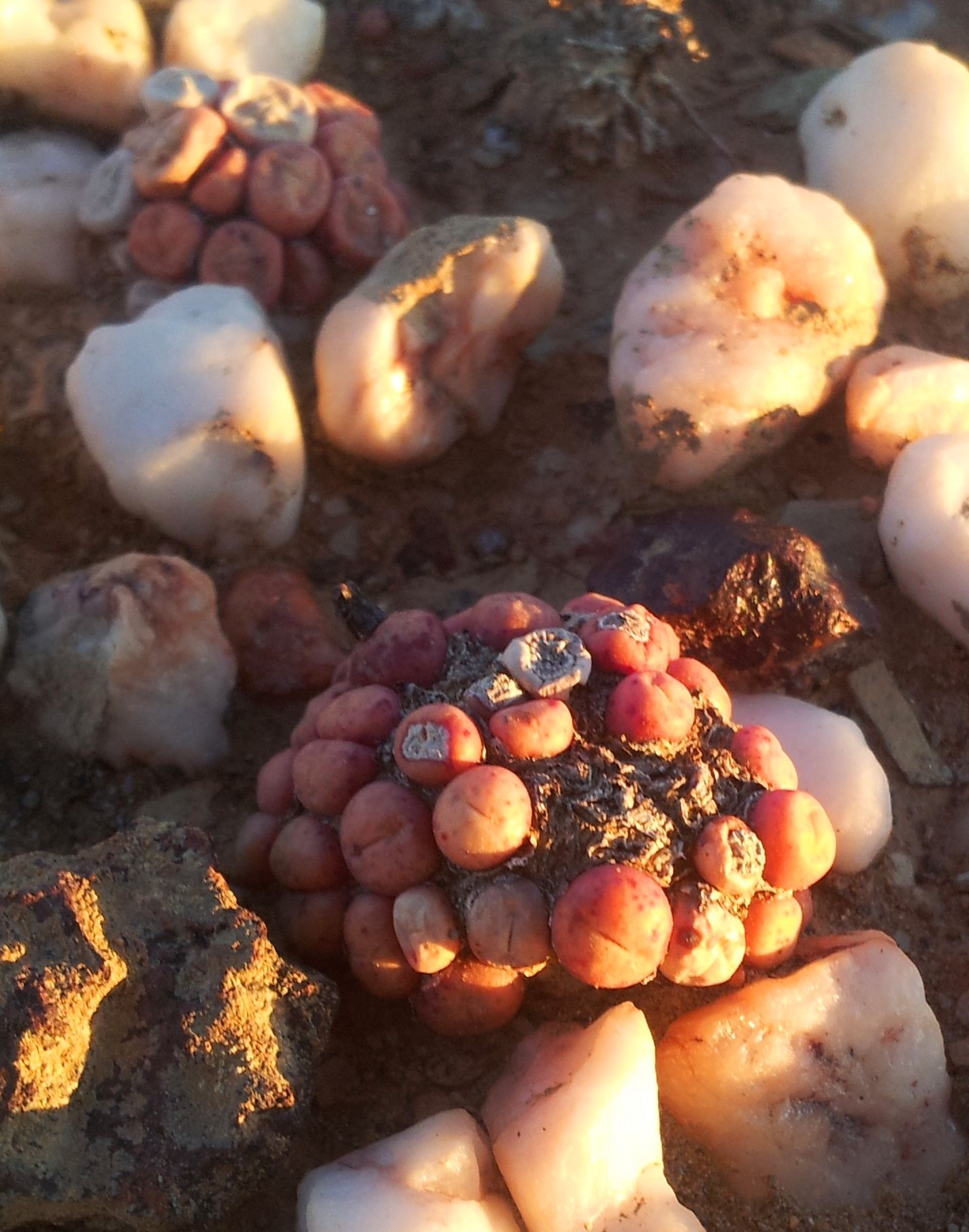
Typical "pill-shaped" heads of Conophytum piluliforme

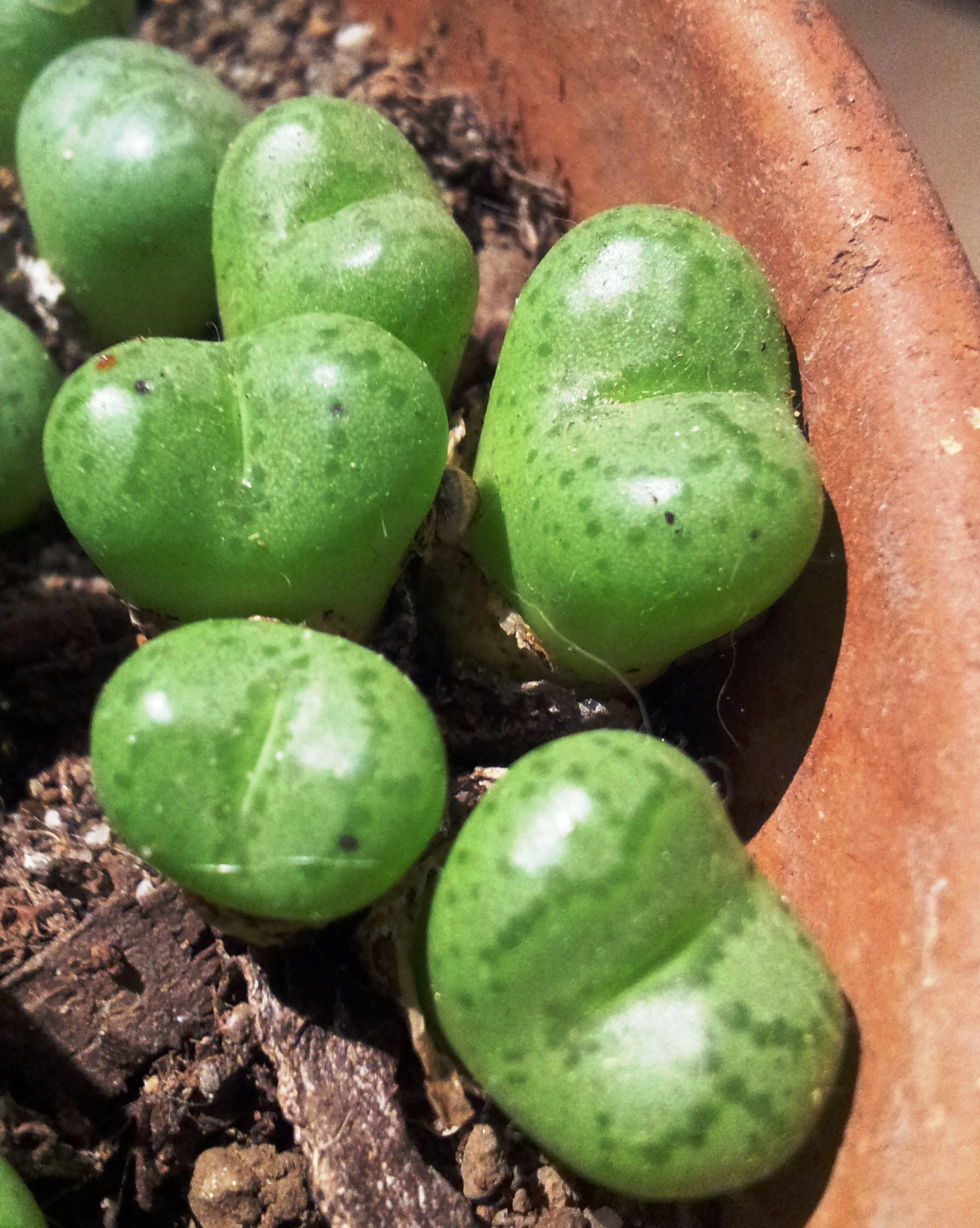
Typical "fig-shaped" heads of Conophytum ficiforme

== Distribution and habitat ==
The easternmost of all Conophytum species, C. truncatum is indigenous to the Little Karoo region, and its surrounds, in the southern Cape of South Africa. It ranges from near Montagu in the west, as far east as the Springbokvlakte.

They grow primarily in the winter, when rainfall swell them. After flowering, they go into dormancy through the summer, when they are covered in a dry papery sheath. They inhabit extremely well-drained soil, in spots protected by rocks or bushes.
