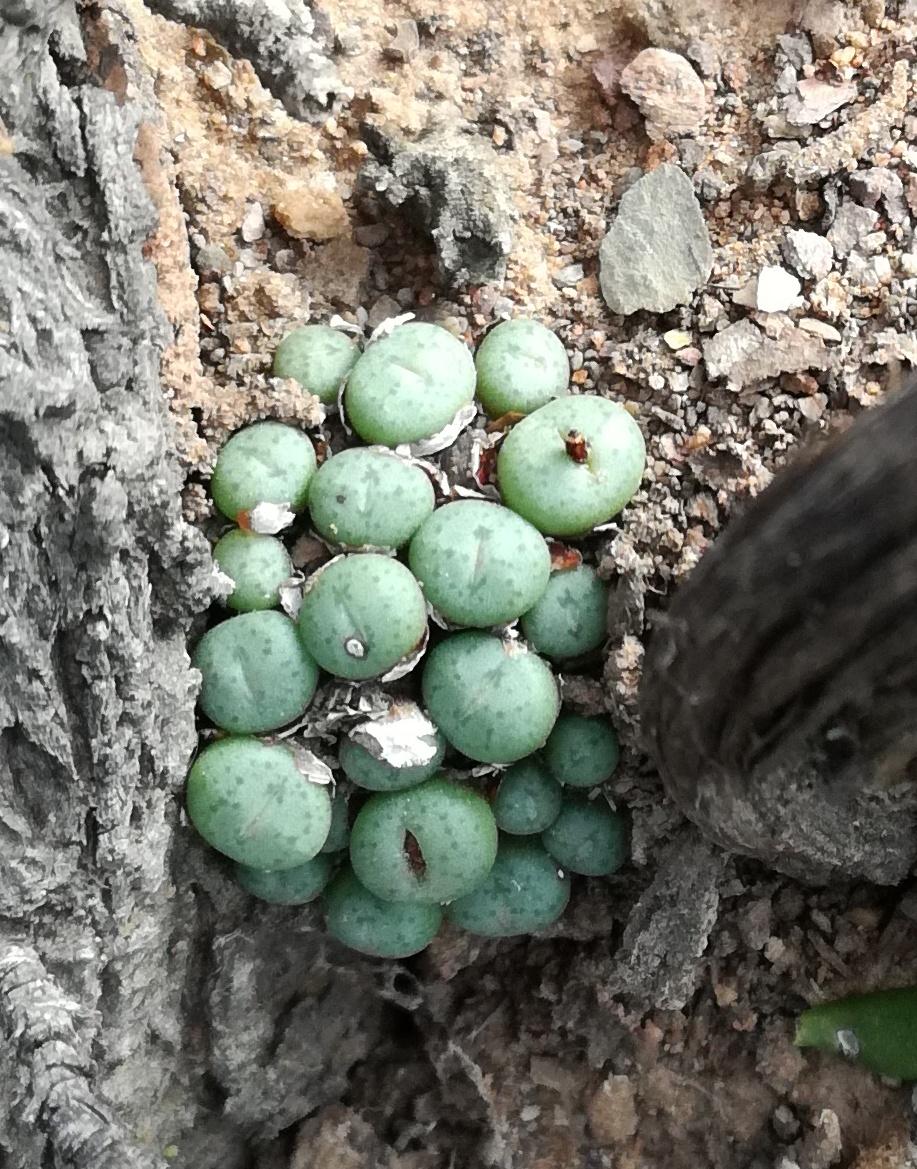

Conservation status
- Endangered (IUCN 3.1)
- CITES Appendix III

Scientific classification
- Kingdom: Plantae
- Clade: Embryophytes
- Clade: Tracheophytes
- Clade: Angiosperms
- Clade: Eudicots
- Order: Caryophyllales
- Family: Aizoaceae
- Genus: Conophytum
- Species: C. piluliforme

Binomial name
- Conophytum piluliforme (Thunb.) N.E.Br.

= Conophytum piluliforme =

Species of succulent

Conophytum piluliforme is a small South Africa species of succulent plant of the genus Conophytum.

== Description ==
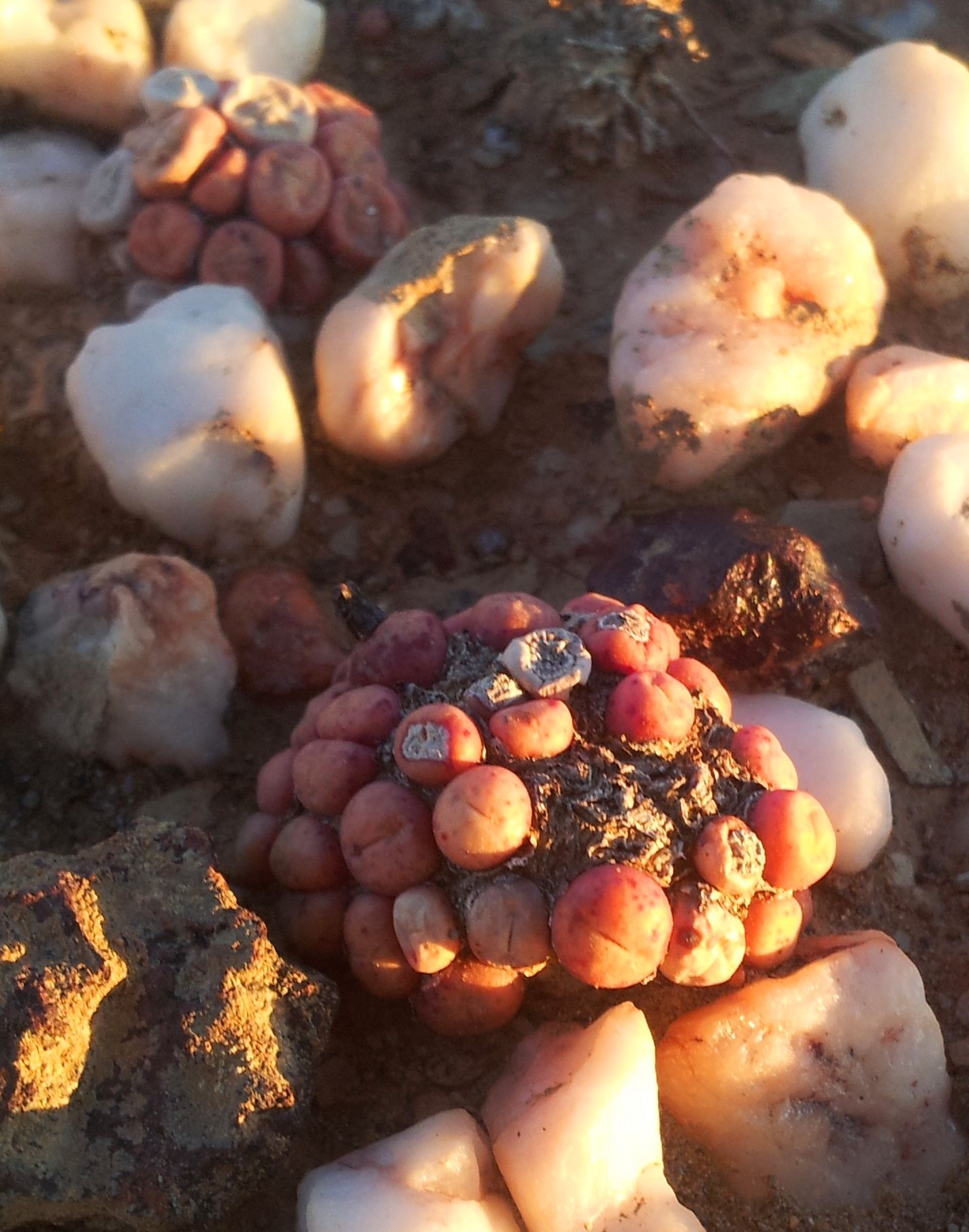
Conophytum piluliforme in habitat

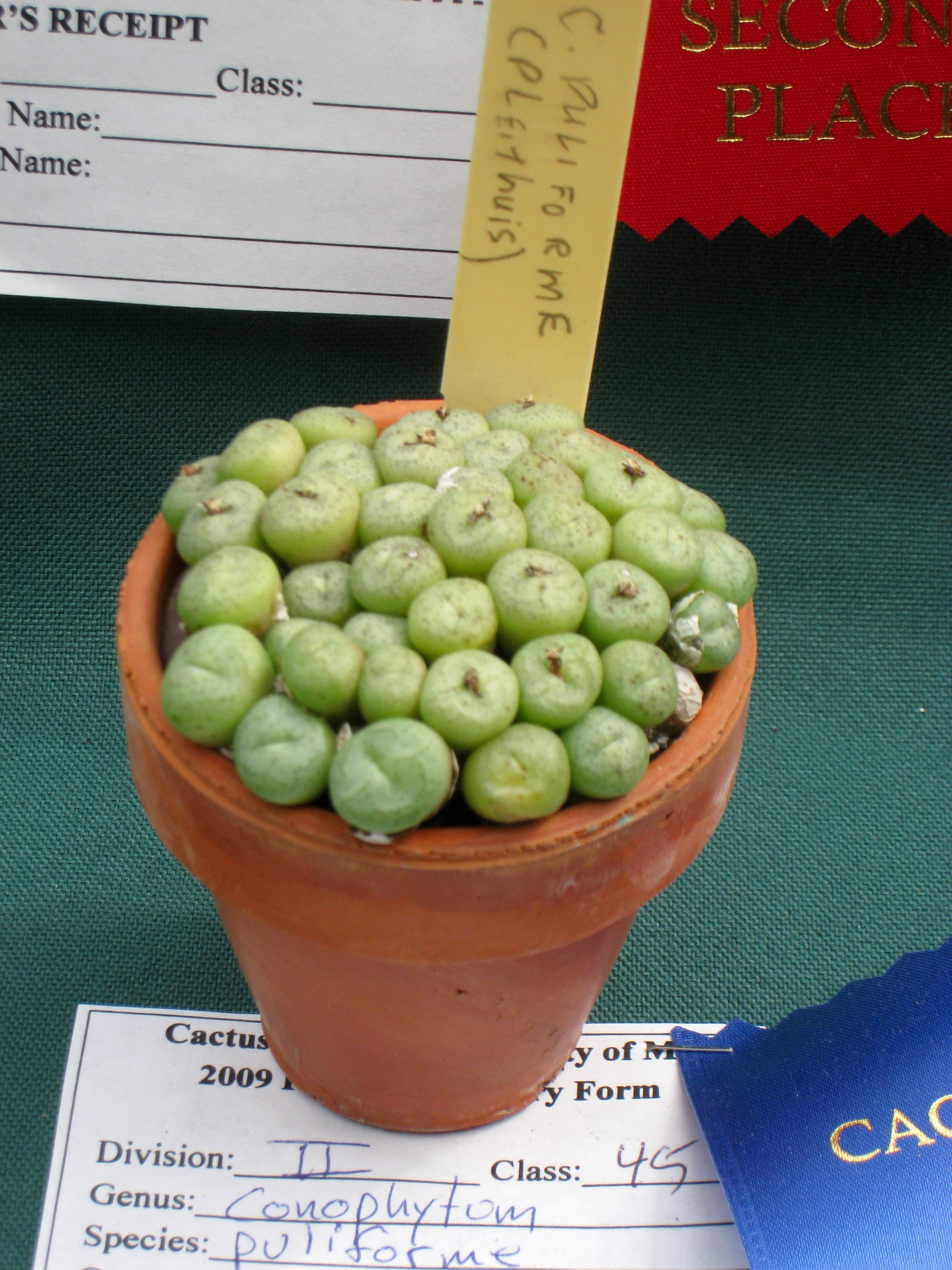
Conophytum piluliforme in cultivation

Small, mat-forming succulent. The obconical, flattened, "pill-shaped" ("piluliforme") head is small (less than 5mm across the fissure) and has sparse or no lines on it. Flowers are red, purple or maroon.

Conophytum piluliforme subspecies edwardii differs in having a more keeled body shape.

== Distribution and habitat ==
This species is indigenous to the far western corner of the Little Karoo region, in the Western Cape of South Africa. It occurs around Montagu, Barrydale, and as far as Ladismith in the east.

They grow primarily in the winter, when rainfall swell them. After flowering, they go into dormancy through the summer, when they are covered in a dry papery sheath. They inhabit extremely well-drained soil, in spots protected by rocks or bushes. They split and crack if they receive too much water.

=== Relatives and distinguishing features ===
It is closely related to its neighbouring species Conophytum joubertii which is a similar small size (less than 5 mm x 5 mm), but has a more convex or cylindrical shape to its bodies, and has cream or white flowers.

The widespread Conophytum truncatum grows throughout the Little Karoo and co-occurs with C. piluliforme. Conophytum truncatum has more strongly flattened, truncated bodies, and spots that are scattered randomly (not in lines).

The larger Conophytum ficiforme occurs in the Breede River valley just to the west, but has globose, keeled, "fig-shaped" ("ficiforme") bodies, with spots in angular, horseshoe-shaped lines.

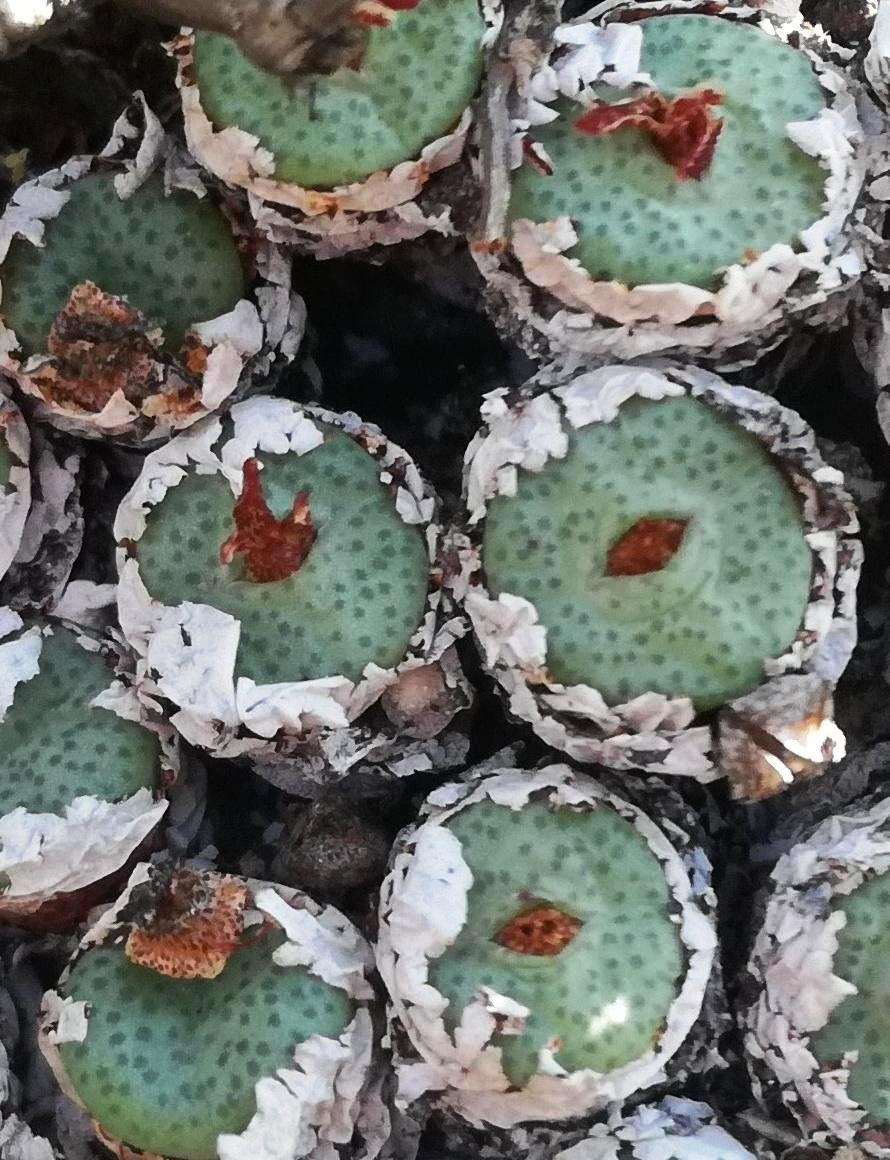
Typical heads of Conophytum truncatum

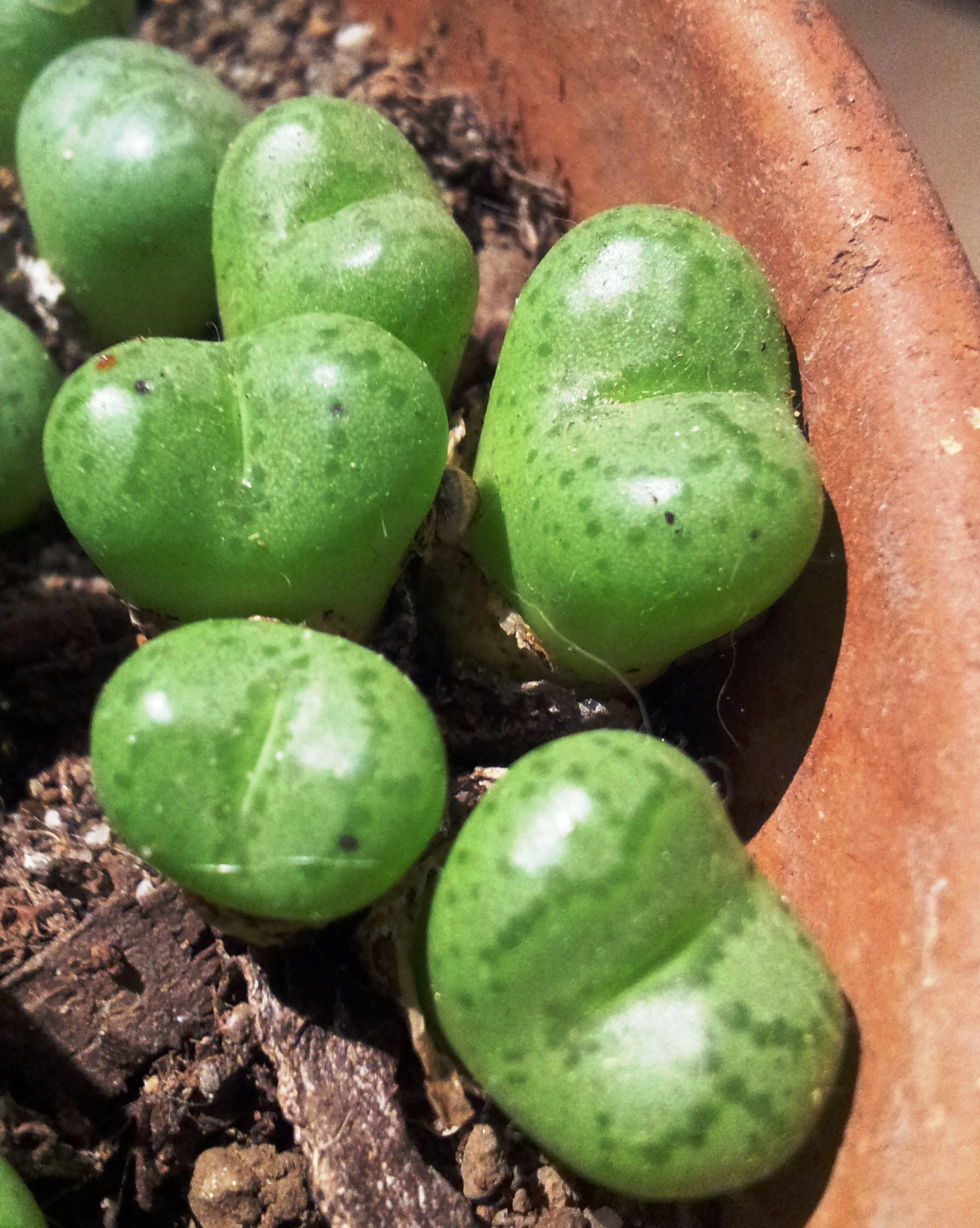
Typical heads of Conophytum ficiforme
