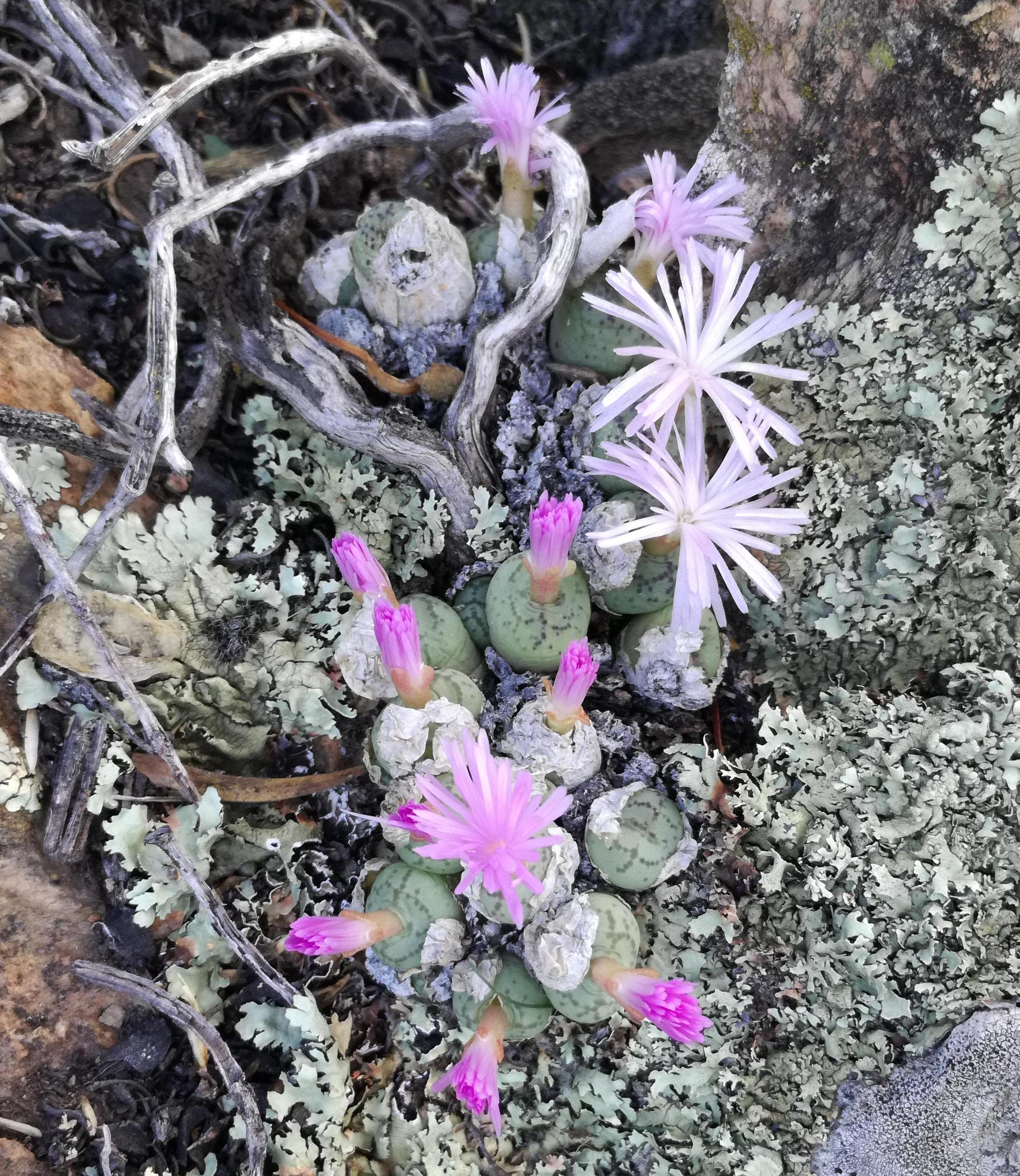
- Conophytum ficiforme in flower in habitat

Conservation status
- Endangered (IUCN 3.1)
- CITES Appendix III

Scientific classification
- Kingdom: Plantae
- Clade: Embryophytes
- Clade: Tracheophytes
- Clade: Spermatophytes
- Clade: Angiosperms
- Clade: Eudicots
- Order: Caryophyllales
- Family: Aizoaceae
- Genus: Conophytum
- Species: C. ficiforme

Binomial name
- Conophytum ficiforme (Haw.) N.E.Br.

= Conophytum ficiforme =

Species of succulent

Conophytum ficiforme is a small South African species of succulent plant of the genus Conophytum.

== Description ==
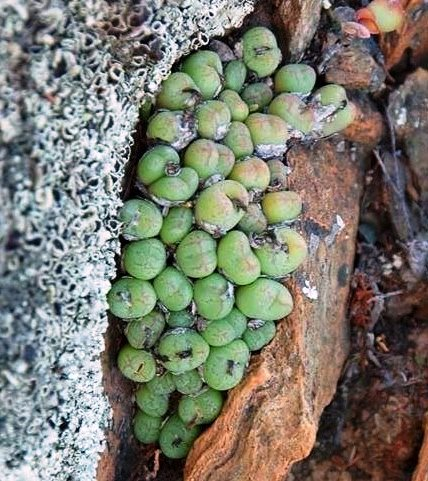
Conophytum ficiforme in habitat

The name "ficiforme" is Latin for "fig-shaped", and refers to the shape of their bodies, which is raised, globose and keeled. In addition, they can be distinguished from most other Conophytums by the distinctive dots, which clearly form angular, (horseshoe-shaped) lines over their heads.

They have pale pink flowers.

== Distribution ==
It is indigenous to the Robertson Karoo vegetation of the Breede River Valley, Western Cape, South Africa. It is especially common in the mountains north of Worcester as well as in McGregor, south of Robertson and in Bonnievale.

Their habitat is rocky crevices and outcrops, where they form clumps in sheltered or partially shaded positions. They receive rainfall primarily in the winter. In the summer they go into dormancy in dry leaf sheathes.

=== Relatives and distinguishing features ===
C. ficiforme is closely related to several smaller species which occur to the east of its distribution.

Conophytum piluliforme occurs in the Little Karoo to the east, but has smaller (less than 5 mm x 5 mm), obconical, flattened, "pill-shaped" ("piluliforme") heads, with few or no spots.

The widespread Conophytum truncatum grows throughout the Little Karoo, but has strongly flattened, truncated bodies, and spots that are scattered randomly (not in lines).

The rarer species Conophytum joubertii also has smaller (less than 5 mm x 5 mm), more convex or cylindrical shaped heads, but has cream or white flowers.

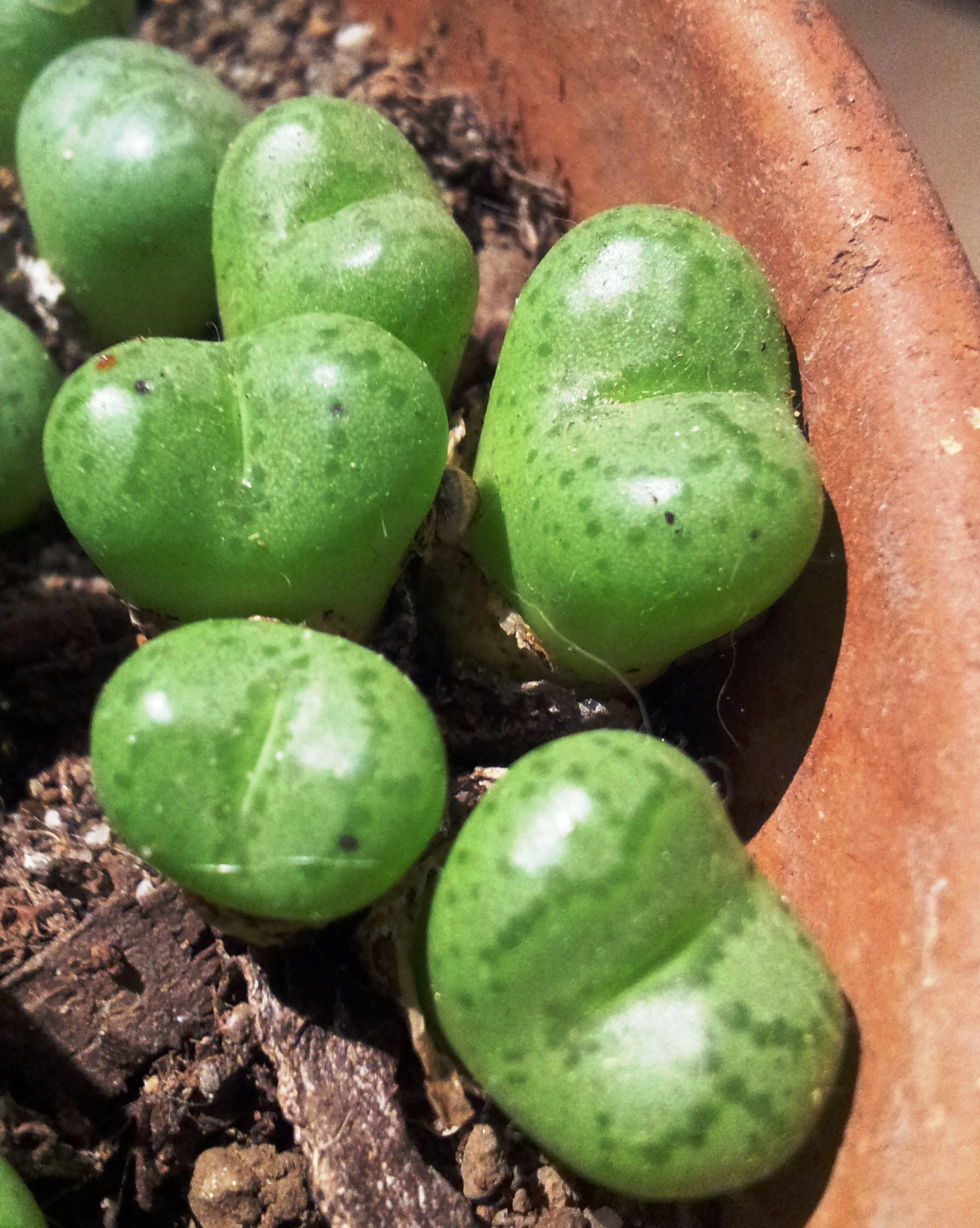
Typical keeled, "fig-shaped" heads of Conophytum ficiforme

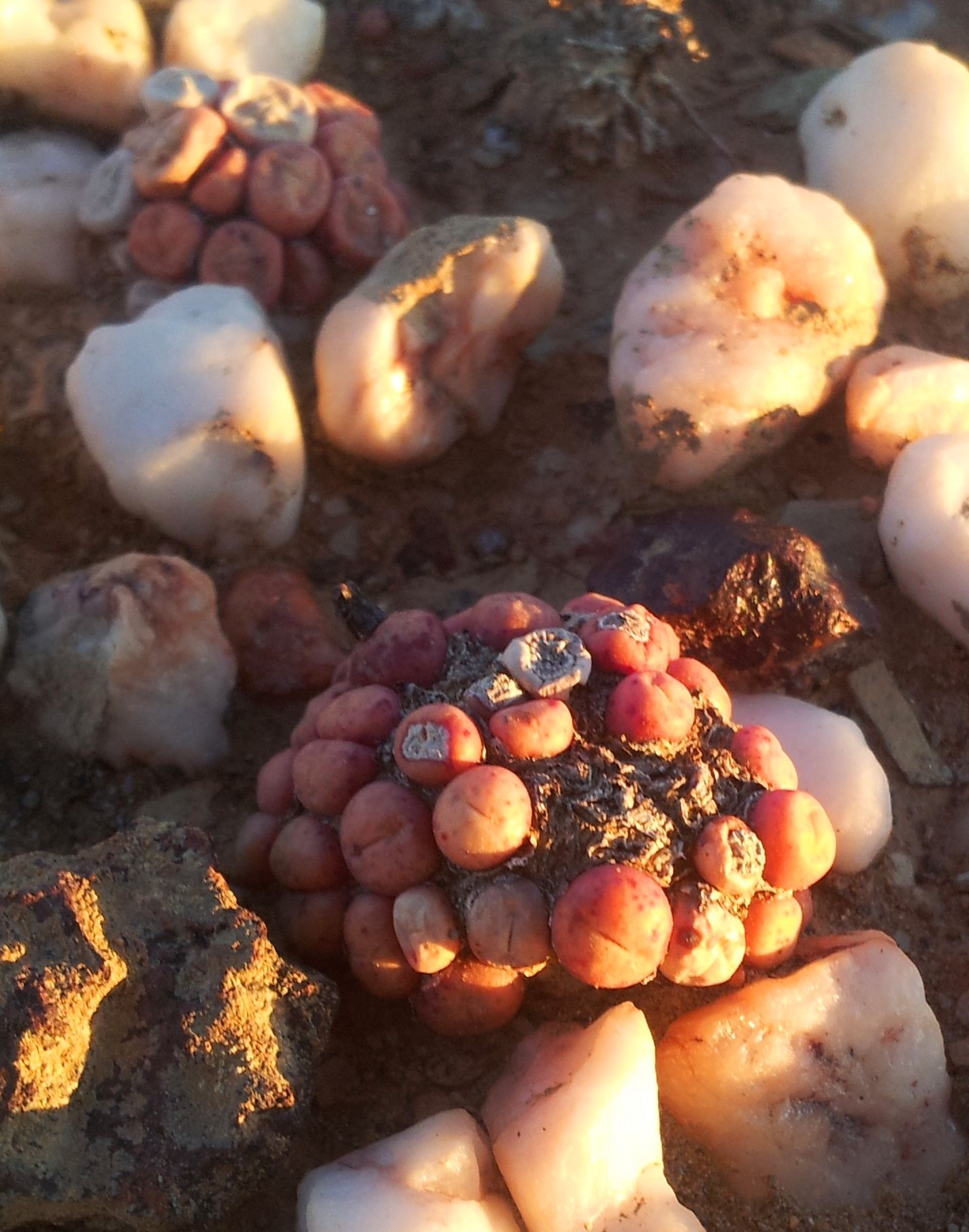
Typical circular, "pill-shaped" heads of Conophytum piluliforme

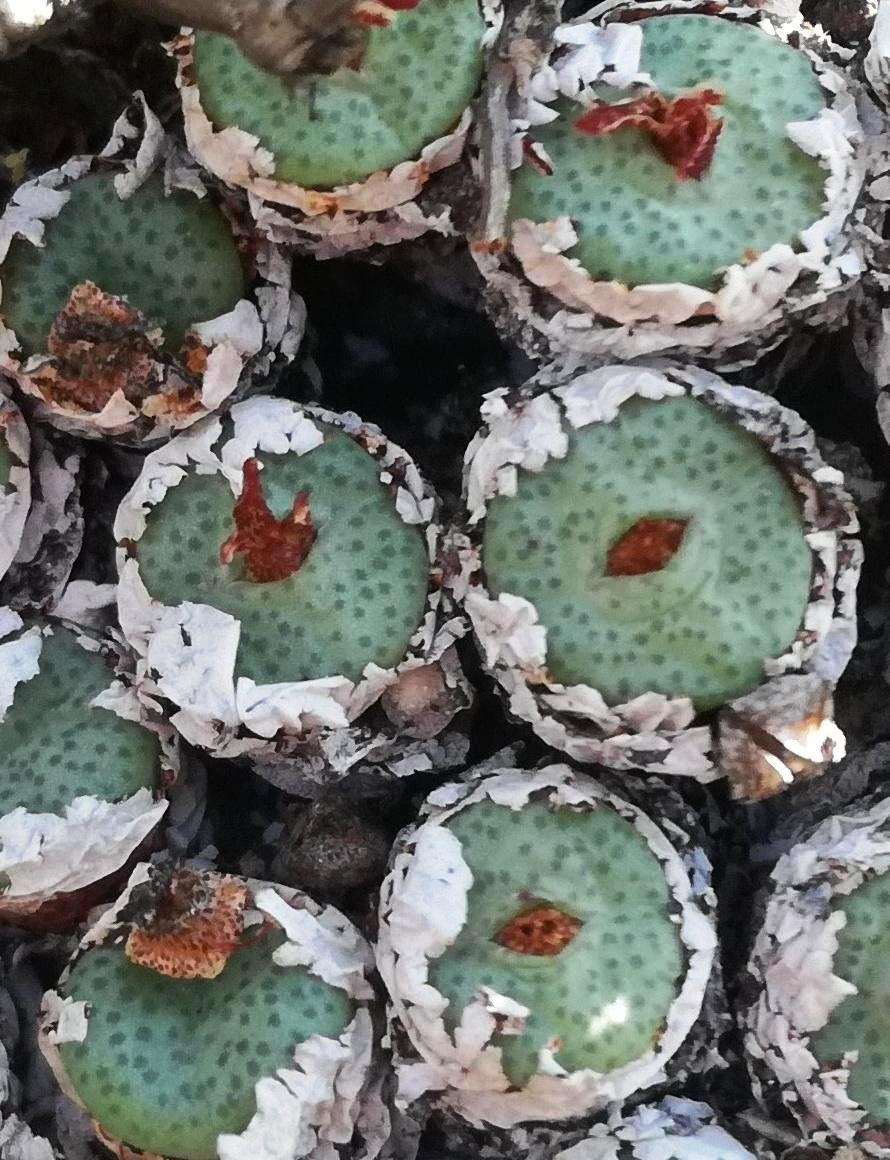
Typical flat, "truncated" heads of Conophytum truncatum
