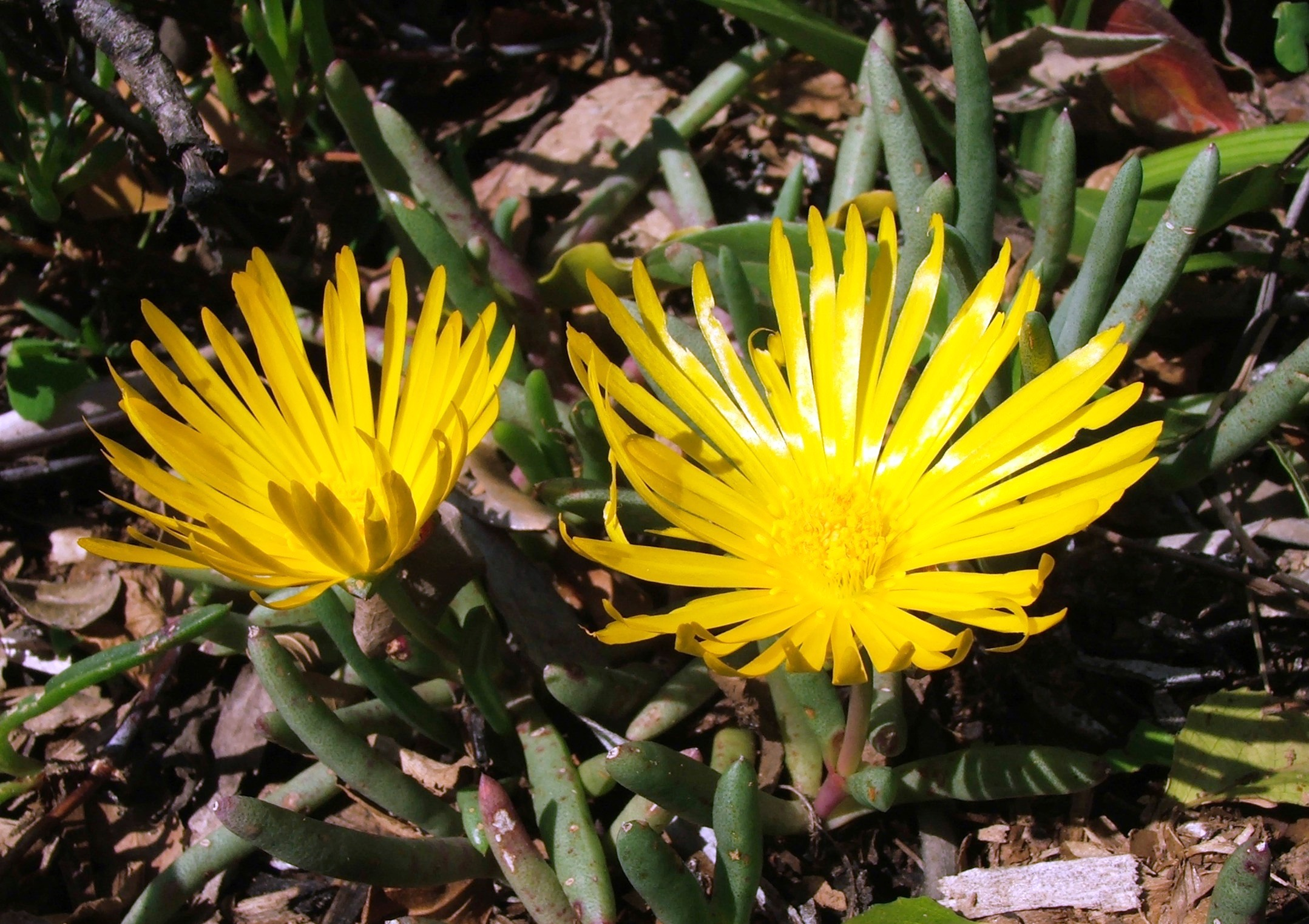

Scientific classification
- Kingdom: Plantae
- Clade: Tracheophytes
- Clade: Angiosperms
- Clade: Eudicots
- Order: Caryophyllales
- Family: Aizoaceae
- Genus: Jordaaniella
- Species: J. dubia

Binomial name
- Jordaaniella dubia (Haw.) H.E.K.Hartmann

= Jordaaniella dubia =

Species of succulent

Jordaaniella dubia is a coastal succulent plant of the family Aizoaceae. It is indigenous to the Cape Provinces of South Africa, and is easy to propagate, making an attractive ground cover for coastal gardens.

Jordaaniella dubia is smaller than its relative, the (now extinct in the wild) Jordaaniella anemoniflora, with large, bright yellow flowers. Its natural habitat is the coastal Strandveld of the Western Cape, but it grows well as a garden plant in sandy or coastal gardens almost anywhere.
