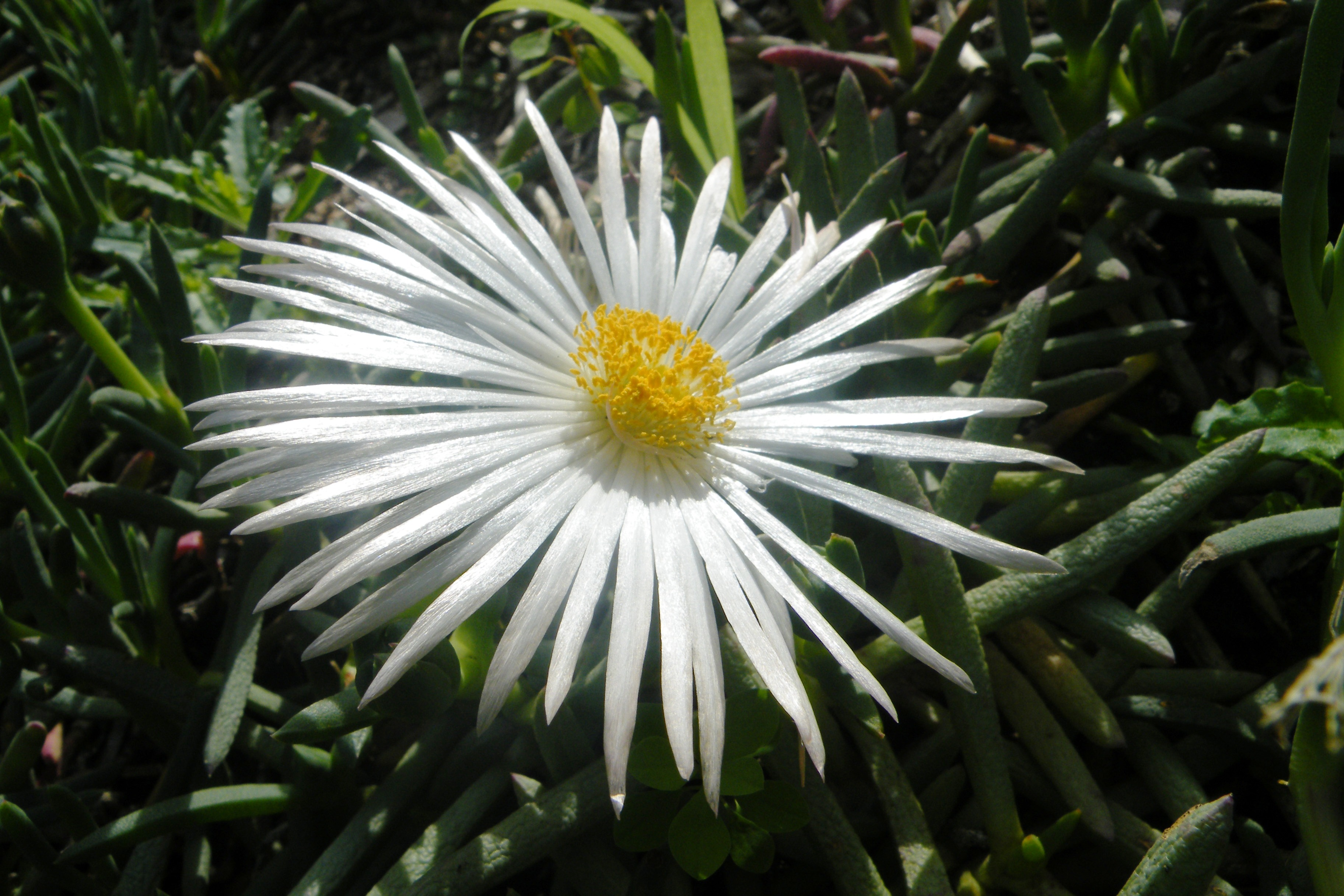
- Jordaaniella anemoniflora

Scientific classification
- Kingdom: Plantae
- Clade: Tracheophytes
- Clade: Angiosperms
- Clade: Eudicots
- Order: Caryophyllales
- Family: Aizoaceae
- Subfamily: Ruschioideae
- Tribe: Ruschieae
- Genus: Jordaaniella; H.E.K.Hartmann

= Jordaaniella =

Genus of succulents

Jordaaniella is a genus of plants in the family Aizoaceae. The plants of this genus are indigenous to Namibia and South Africa's Cape Provinces in southern Africa. Seven species are accepted:

- Jordaaniella anemoniflora (L.Bolus) van Jaarsv.
- Jordaaniella clavifolia (L.Bolus) H.E.K.Hartmann
- Jordaaniella cuprea (L.Bolus) H.E.K.Hartmann
- Jordaaniella dubia (Haw.) H.E.K.Hartmann
- Jordaaniella maritima (L.Bolus) van Jaarsv.
- Jordaaniella spongiosa (L.Bolus) H.E.K.Hartmann
- Jordaaniella uniflora (L.Bolus) H.E.K.Hartmann
