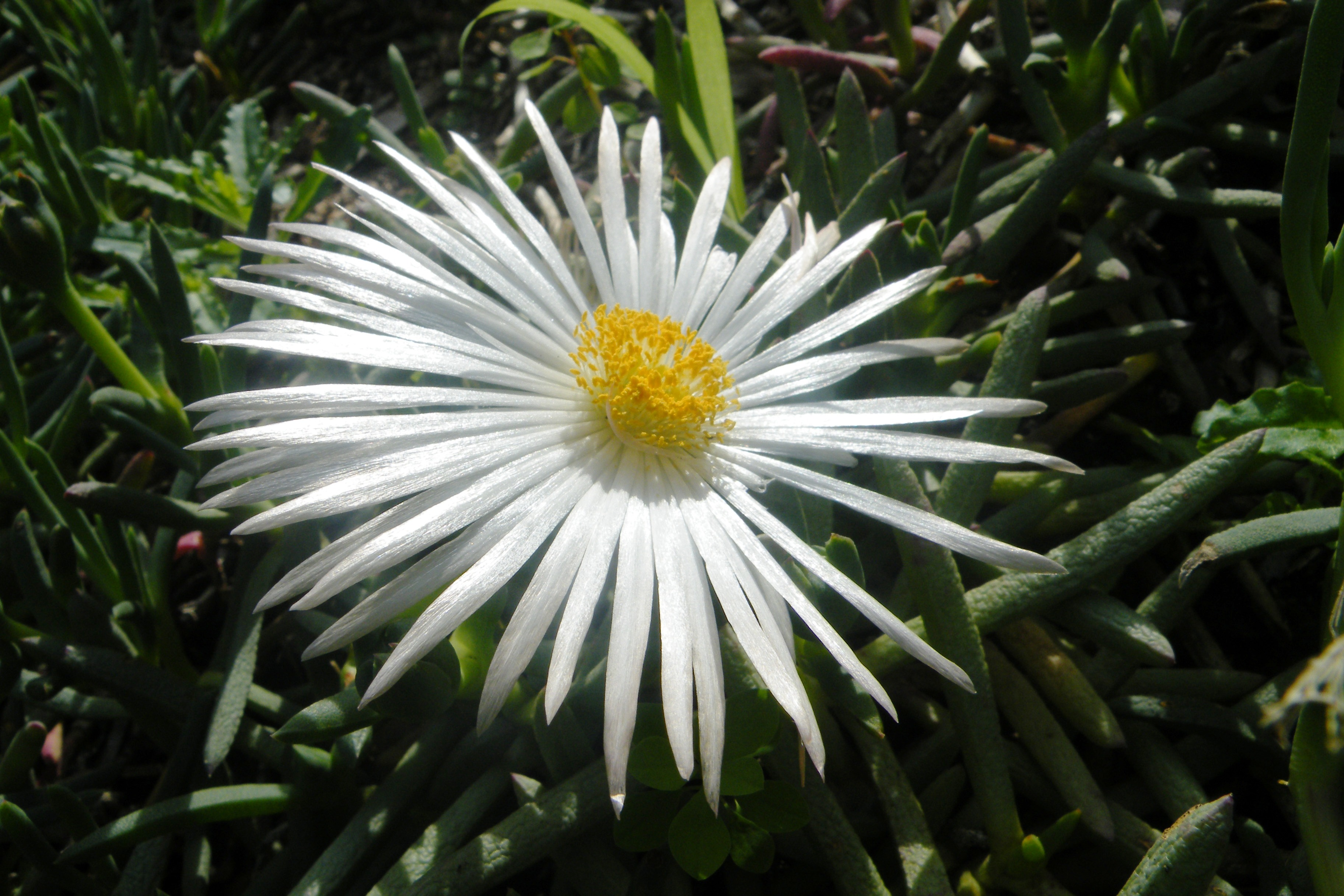

Scientific classification
- Kingdom: Plantae
- Clade: Tracheophytes
- Clade: Angiosperms
- Clade: Eudicots
- Order: Caryophyllales
- Family: Aizoaceae
- Genus: Jordaaniella
- Species: J. anemoniflora

Binomial name
- Jordaaniella anemoniflora (L.Bolus) van Jaarsv.

Synonyms
- Cephalophyllum anemoniflorum (L.Bolus) Schwantes; Mesembryanthemum anemoniflorum L.Bolus

= Jordaaniella anemoniflora =

Species of succulent

Jordaaniella anemoniflora, the anemone vygie, is a plant species in the family Aizoaceae. It is indigenous to a tiny area of the Cape Flats suburbs within the city of Cape Town, South Africa, but is now extinct in the wild.

This is a small, delicate succulent groundcover. It has fat, grey leaves and large pink or white flowers.

The natural habitat of the anemone vygie now lies beneath the urban sprawl of the city of Cape Town. Its last population in the wild was at Macassar on the Cape Flats but it was destroyed in 1992 to make way for housing. Consequently, it is now extinct in the wild, although specimens have been preserved at botanical gardens such as Kirstenbosch. There is currently a project to reintroduce the plant to the grounds of a military base that is near to its original Macassar habitat.

This unique little plant grows surprisingly well in coastal gardens, and it makes a very attractive groundcover for sunny parts of the garden. It can be propagated very easily by cuttings.
