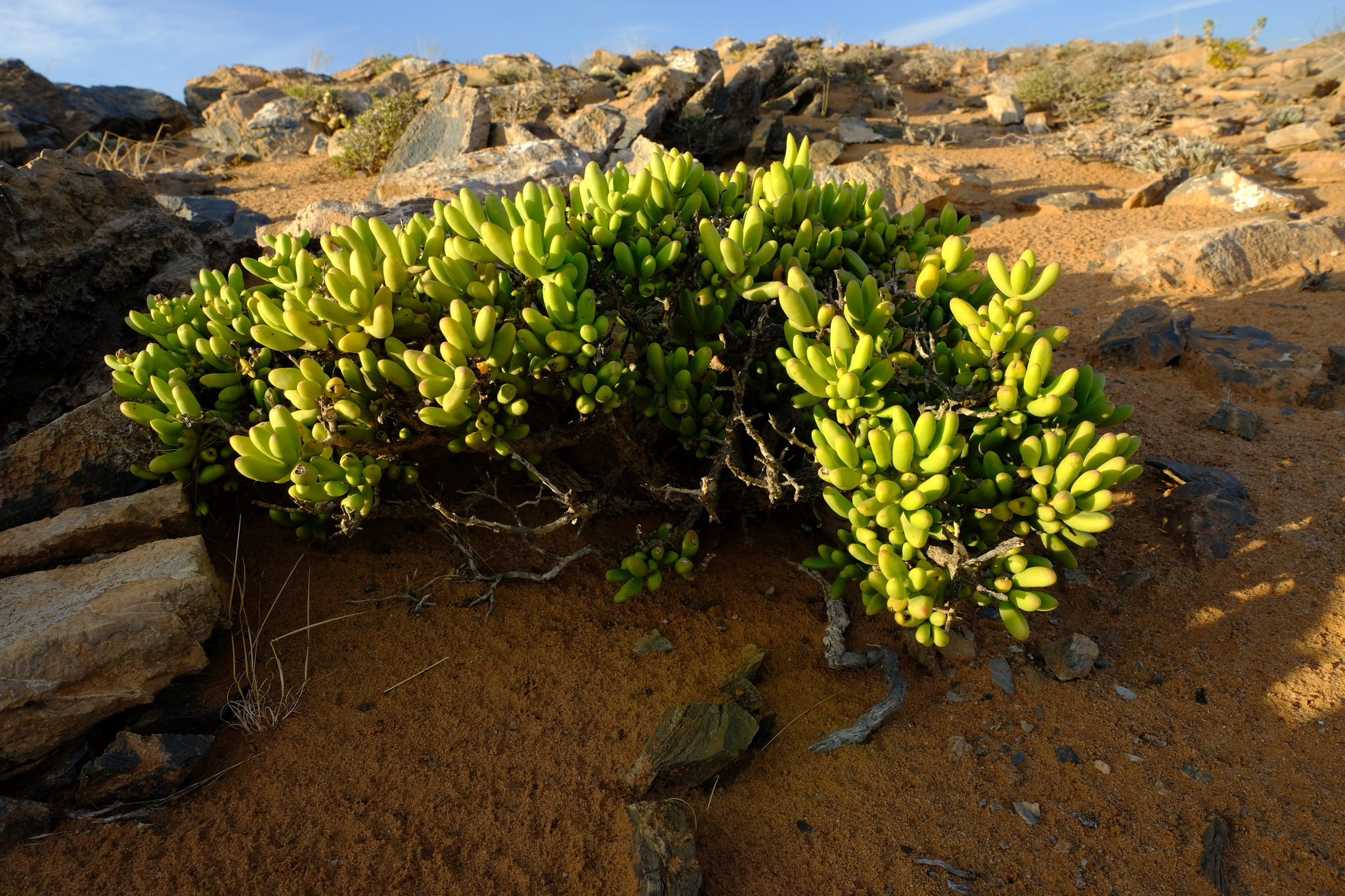
- Enarganthe octonaria

Scientific classification
- Kingdom: Plantae
- Clade: Tracheophytes
- Clade: Angiosperms
- Clade: Eudicots
- Order: Caryophyllales
- Family: Aizoaceae
- Subfamily: Ruschioideae
- Tribe: Ruschieae
- Genus: Enarganthe; N.E.Br.
- Species: E. octonaria

Binomial name
- Enarganthe octonaria (L.Bolus) N.E.Br.

Synonyms
- Mesembryanthemum octonarium L.Bolus (1927) (basionym); Ruschia octonaria (L.Bolus) G.D.Rowley

= Enarganthe =

Genus of plants

Enarganthe is a genus of flowering plants belonging to the family Aizoaceae. It contains a single species, Enarganthe octonaria, a succulent subshrub native to the western Cape Provinces of South Africa.

== Phylogeny ==
Klak et al. (2013) shows this phylogenetic consensus tree based on the Bayesian analysis using 10 chlorophyll markers.

- Conophytum clade
  - Ruschianthus
  - Jensenobotrya
  - - - Enarganthe
      - Conophytum
    - - Cheiridopsis (incl. Odontophorus and Ihrenfeldtia)
      - - Namaquanthus
        - - Octopoma
          - Schlechteranthus (incl. Polymita)
