= Esterhuysen =

Esterhuysen may refer to:

== People ==
- Anriette Esterhuysen (born 1953), South African computer networking pioneer and human rights defender
- Elsie Elizabeth Esterhuysen (1912–2006), South African botanist
- Richard Grant Esterhuysen, real name of Richard E. Grant (born 1957), British-Swazi actor

== Science ==
=== Botany ===
- Esterhuysenia, genus of flowering plants belonging to the family Aizoaceae, named in honor of Elsie Elizabeth Esterhuysen

=== Astronomy ===
- 11694 Esterhuysen, minor planet

== See also ==
- Francois Esterhuyzen (born 1994), South African rugby union player
