= Sederbergia =

Scientific classification
- Kingdom: Plantae
- Clade: Tracheophytes
- Clade: Angiosperms
- Clade: Eudicots
- Order: Caryophyllales
- Family: Aizoaceae
- Tribe: Ruschieae
- Genus: Sederbergia; Klak

Type species
- Sederbergia guthrieae (L.Bolus) Klak

Genus of flowering plants

Sederbergia is a genus of flowering plants in the family Aizoaceae. It includes four species native to the Cape Provinces of South Africa.

The species were formerly placed in genus Lampranthus, and later transferred to Esterhuysenia or Oscularia. A phylogenetic and morphological study published in 2024 found the four species formed a clade distinct from these genera, and the authors described the new genus Sederbergia to accommodate them.

== Species ==
Four species are accepted.

- Sederbergia drepanophylla (Schltr. & A.Berger) Klak
- Sederbergia guthrieae (L.Bolus) Klak
- Sederbergia inclaudens (L.Bolus) Klak
- Sederbergia mucronata (L.Bolus) Klak
