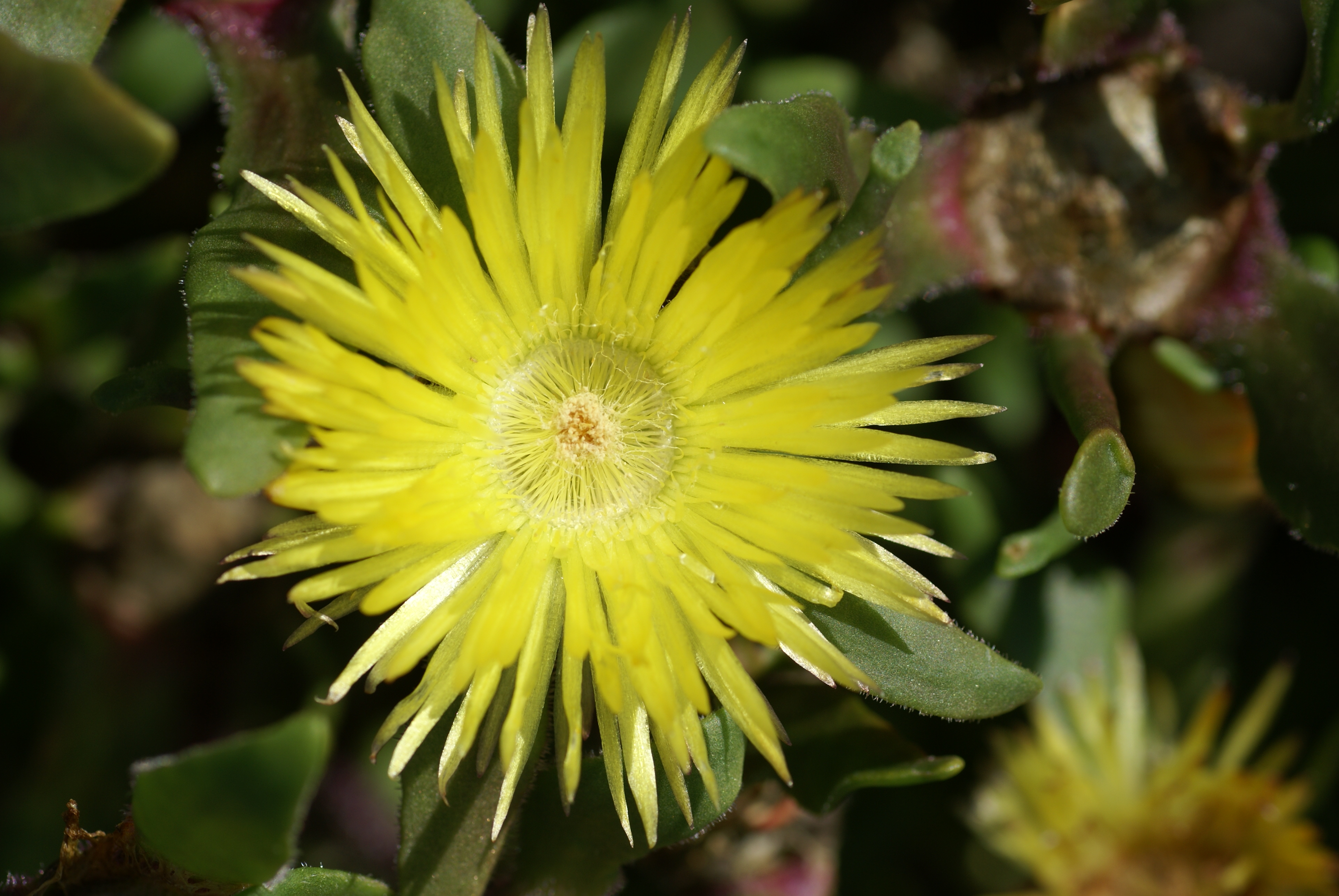

Scientific classification
- Kingdom: Plantae
- Clade: Embryophytes
- Clade: Tracheophytes
- Clade: Angiosperms
- Clade: Eudicots
- Order: Caryophyllales
- Family: Aizoaceae
- Genus: Carpanthea
- Species: C. pomeridiana

Binomial name
- Carpanthea pomeridiana (L.) N.E.Br.

Synonyms
- List: Carpanthea pilosa (Haw.) L.Bolus; Macrocaulon candollei (Haw.) N.E.Br.; Mesembryanthemum candollei Haw.; Mesembryanthemum glabrum Haw. ex Steud.; Mesembryanthemum helianthoides Sol. ex DC.; Mesembryanthemum pilosum Haw.; Mesembryanthemum pomeridianum L.

= Carpanthea pomeridiana =

Species of flowering plant

Carpanthea pomeridiana, the afternoon carpanthea, is a species of flowering plant in the genus Carpanthea, native to the western Cape Provinces of South Africa, and introduced to New South Wales, Australia. It has gained the Royal Horticultural Society's Award of Garden Merit as an ornamental.
