= Anisostigma =

Scientific classification
- Kingdom: Plantae
- Clade: Tracheophytes
- Clade: Angiosperms
- Clade: Eudicots
- Order: Caryophyllales
- Family: Aizoaceae
- Subfamily: Sesuvioideae
- Tribe: Anisostigmateae
- Genus: Anisostigma; Schinz
- Species: A. schenckii

Binomial name
- Anisostigma schenckii (Schinz) Schinz

Synonyms
- Tetragonia schenckii Schinz

Genus of flowering plants

Anisostigma is a genus of flowering plants in the family Aizoaceae. It includes a single species, Anisostigma schenckii, a shrub endemic to Namibia.

The species was first described as Tetragonia schenckii by Hans Schinz in 1894. In 1897 Schinz described the new genus Anisostigma and moved the species there. In 2017 Klak, Hanáček, and Bruyns found that Anisostigma and the two species in genus Tribulocarpus, were a sister clade to the rest of subfamily Sesuvioideae, and distinguished by having tubular flowers. They placed the two genera in the newly described tribe Anisostigmateae, with the other members of the subfamily remaining in tribe Sesuvieae.
