= Skiatophytum =

Scientific classification
- Kingdom: Plantae
- Clade: Tracheophytes
- Clade: Angiosperms
- Clade: Eudicots
- Order: Caryophyllales
- Family: Aizoaceae
- Subfamily: Ruschioideae
- Tribe: Apatesieae
- Genus: Skiatophytum; L.Bolus

Synonyms
- Caryotophora Leistner; Gymnopoma N.E.Br.

Genus of plants

Skiatophytum is a genus of flowering plants belonging to the family Aizoaceae. It is native to the Cape Provinces of South Africa.

Three species are accepted:

- Skiatophytum flaccidifolium Klak
- Skiatophytum skiatophytoides (Leistner) Klak
- Skiatophytum tripolium (L.) L.Bolus
