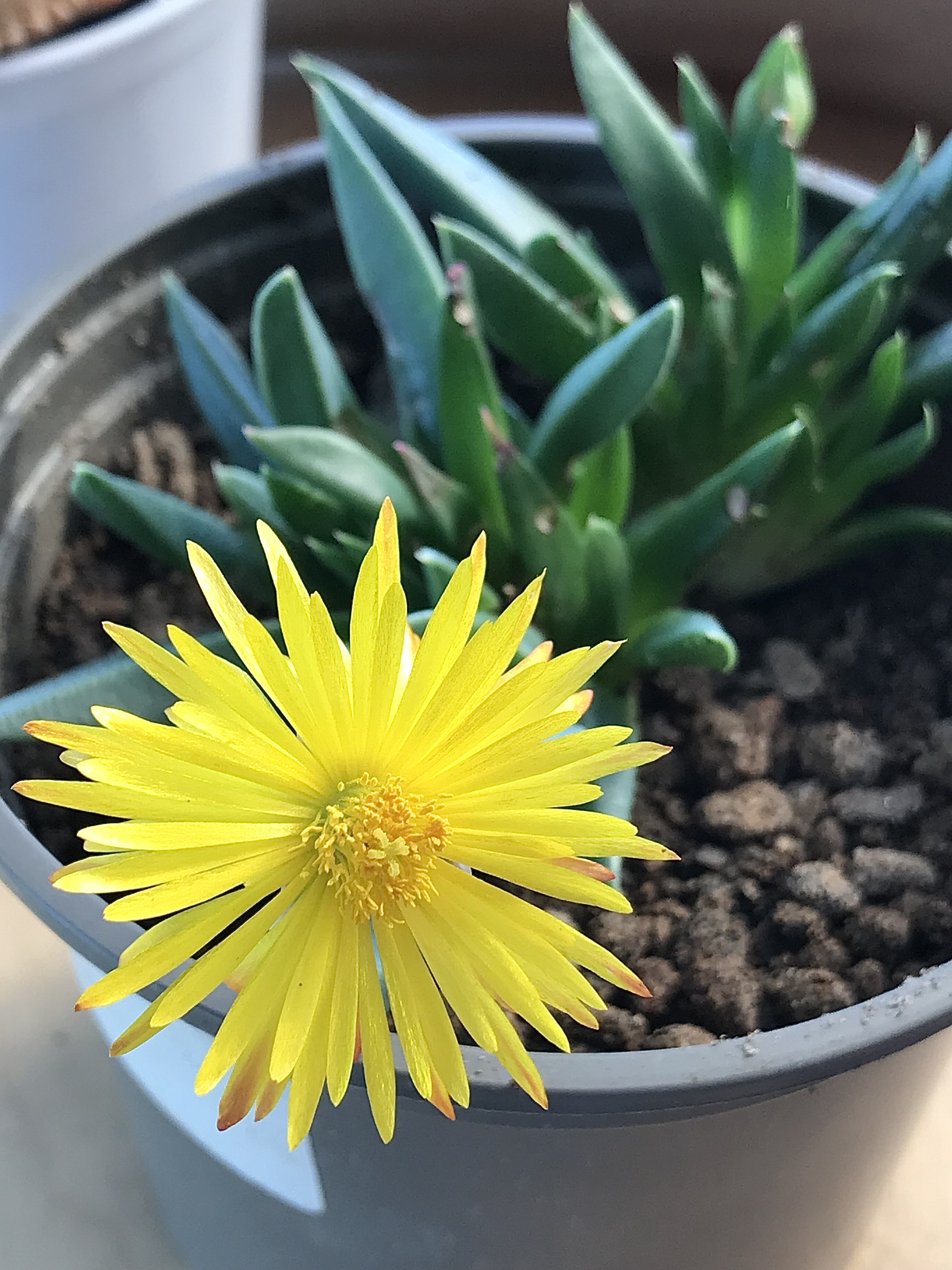

Scientific classification
- Kingdom: Plantae
- Clade: Tracheophytes
- Clade: Angiosperms
- Clade: Eudicots
- Order: Caryophyllales
- Family: Aizoaceae
- Subfamily: Ruschioideae
- Tribe: Ruschieae
- Genus: Bergeranthus; Schwantes

= Bergeranthus =

Genus of flowering plants

Bergeranthus is a genus of flowering plants belonging to the family Aizoaceae. It is endemic to the southern and southeastern Cape Provinces of South Africa.

== Species ==
Ten species are accepted.

- Bergeranthus addoensis L.Bolus
- Bergeranthus albomarginatus A.P.Dold & S.A.Hammer
- Bergeranthus concavus L.Bolus
- Bergeranthus katbergensis L.Bolus
- Bergeranthus leightoniae L.Bolus
- Bergeranthus longisepalus L.Bolus
- Bergeranthus multiceps (Salm-Dyck) Schwantes
- Bergeranthus nanus A.P.Dold & S.A.Hammer
- Bergeranthus scapiger (Haw.) Schwantes
- Bergeranthus vespertinus (A.Berger) Schwantes
