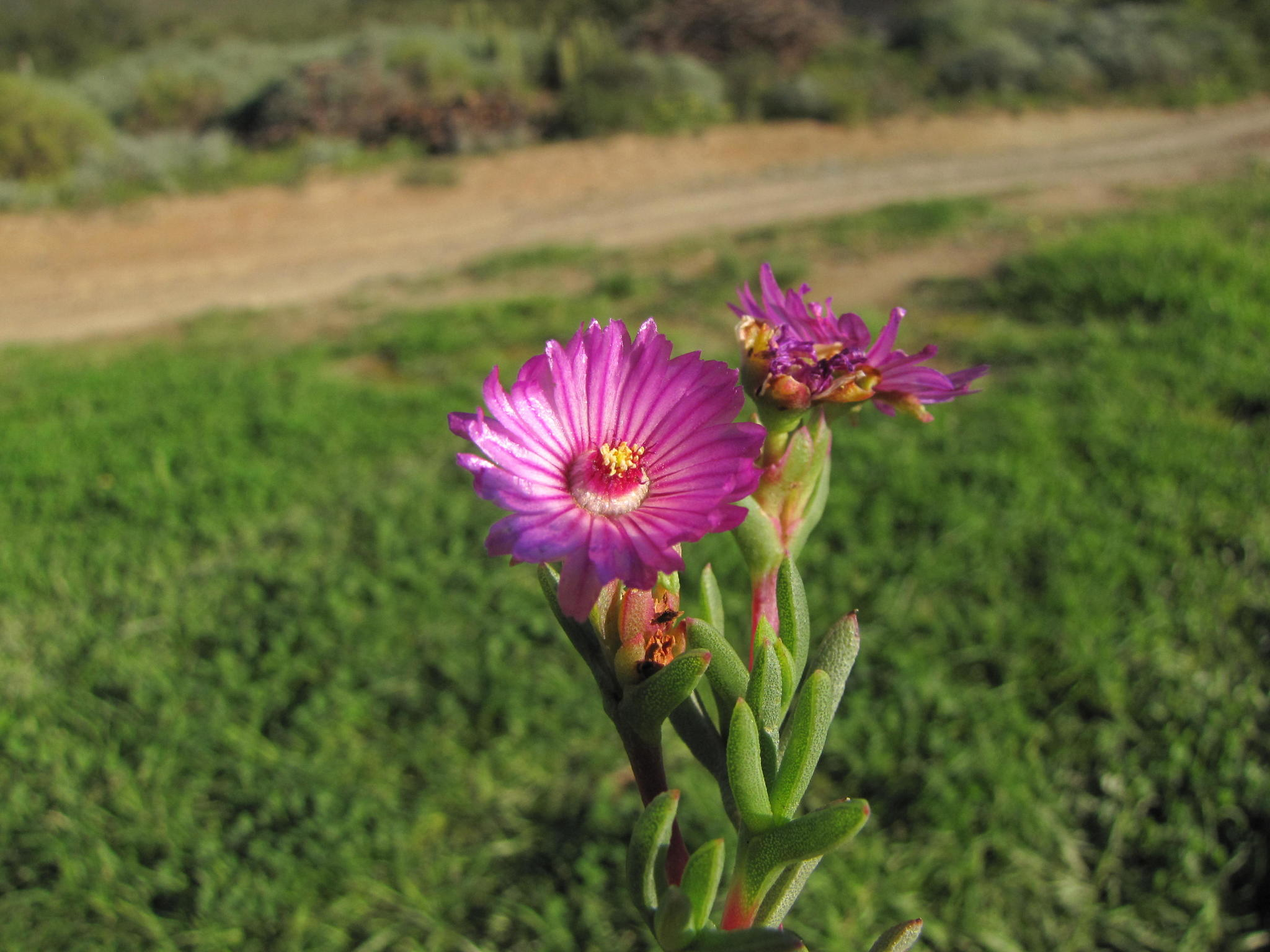
- Stayneria neilii

Scientific classification
- Kingdom: Plantae
- Clade: Tracheophytes
- Clade: Angiosperms
- Clade: Eudicots
- Order: Caryophyllales
- Family: Aizoaceae
- Subfamily: Ruschioideae
- Tribe: Ruschieae
- Genus: Stayneria; L.Bolus
- Species: S. neilii

Binomial name
- Stayneria neilii (L.Bolus) L.Bolus

Synonyms
- Ruschia neilii L.Bolus; Stayneria littlewoodii L.Bolus

= Stayneria =

Species of flowering plant

Stayneria (or 'white-flowered mesemb') is a genus of flowering plants belonging to the family Aizoaceae. It contains a single species, Stayneria neilii. It is in the subfamily Ruschioideae and the tribe Ruschieae.

It is native to the Cape Provinces of the South African Republic. It grows on acid, quartzitic sandstone soil among rocks with taller shrubby vegetation.

== Conservation status ==
It is listed as Vulnerable on the IUCN Red Data List due to habitat loss caused by the expansion of nearby vineyards.

== Description ==
Stayneria neilii is a stout woody shrub of up to 1.5 m in height, bearing reddish brown stems with persistent hardened remains of old leaves. The stem-clasping leaves are dark green, three-sided with a sharp bottom edge and smell like berries. Fragrant leaves in the Aizoaceae family are uncommon and therefore this is an almost unique characteristic rarely found in other genera. Small daisy-like white to pink flowers are arranged in terminal groups of three to seven and borne during the winter and early spring (July to September in the southern hemisphere).

== Taxonomy ==
The genus name of Stayneria is in honour of Frank J. Stayner (1907–1981), a South African horticulturist and specialist in succulents. He was also the curator at the Karoo botanical garden. The Latin specific epithet of neilii refers to the 20th century South African dairy farmer and nurseryman Mr Neil. The genus was first described and published in J. S. African Bot. Vol.27 on page 47 in 1960. The species was published in J. S. African Bot. Vol.33 on page 306 in 1967.

The genus is recognized by the United States Department of Agriculture and the Agricultural Research Service, but they do not list any known species.
