= Malephoropsis =

Scientific classification
- Kingdom: Plantae
- Clade: Tracheophytes
- Clade: Angiosperms
- Clade: Eudicots
- Order: Caryophyllales
- Family: Aizoaceae
- Tribe: Ruschieae
- Genus: Malephoropsis; Klak

Genus of flowering plants

Malephoropis is a genus of flowering plants in the family Aizoaceae. It includes two species native to Namibia and the Cape Provinces of South Africa.

- Malephoropsis otzeniana (Dinter) Klak
- Malephoropsis uniflora (L.Bolus) Klak

The species were formerly placed in genus Lampranthus. A phylogenetic and morphological study published in 2024 found the two species to be unrelated to the rest of Lampranthus and more closely related to the genera Malephora, Disphyma, and Gibbaeum, with which they share soft corky branches, mesomorphic leaves, and only slightly woody fruits with false septa.
