= Hammeria =

Scientific classification
- Kingdom: Plantae
- Clade: Tracheophytes
- Clade: Angiosperms
- Clade: Eudicots
- Order: Caryophyllales
- Family: Aizoaceae
- Genus: Hammeria; Burgoyne

Genus of plants

Hammeria is a genus of flowering plants belonging to the family Aizoaceae.

It is native to the Cape Provinces of the South African Republic.

The genus name of Hammeria is in honour of Steven A. Hammer (b. 1951), American botanist, horticulturist and plant collector and specialist in Conophytum. It was first described and published in Cact. Succ. J. (Los Angeles) Vol.70 on page 204 in 1998.

Known species, according to Kew:

- Hammeria cedarbergensis Klak
- Hammeria gracilis Burgoyne
- Hammeria meleagris (L.Bolus) Klak
