= Lemonanthemum =

Scientific classification
- Kingdom: Plantae
- Clade: Tracheophytes
- Clade: Angiosperms
- Clade: Eudicots
- Order: Caryophyllales
- Family: Aizoaceae
- Genus: Lemonanthemum; Klak (2020)
- Species: L. zygophylloides

Binomial name
- Lemonanthemum zygophylloides (L.Bolus) Klak (2020)

Synonyms
- Drosanthemum zygophylloides (L.Bolus) L.Bolus (1950); Lampranthus zygophylloides (L.Bolus) N.E.Br. (1930); Mesembryanthemum zygophylloides L.Bolus (1927)

Genus of flowering plants

Lemonanthemum zygophylloides is a species of flowering plant in the family Aizoaceae. It is a succulent subshrub endemic to the southwestern Cape Provinces of South Africa. It is the sole species in genus Lemonanthemum.

The species was first described as Mesembryanthemum zygophylloides in 1927 by Louisa Bolus. In 2020 it was placed into its own genus, Lemonanthemum.
