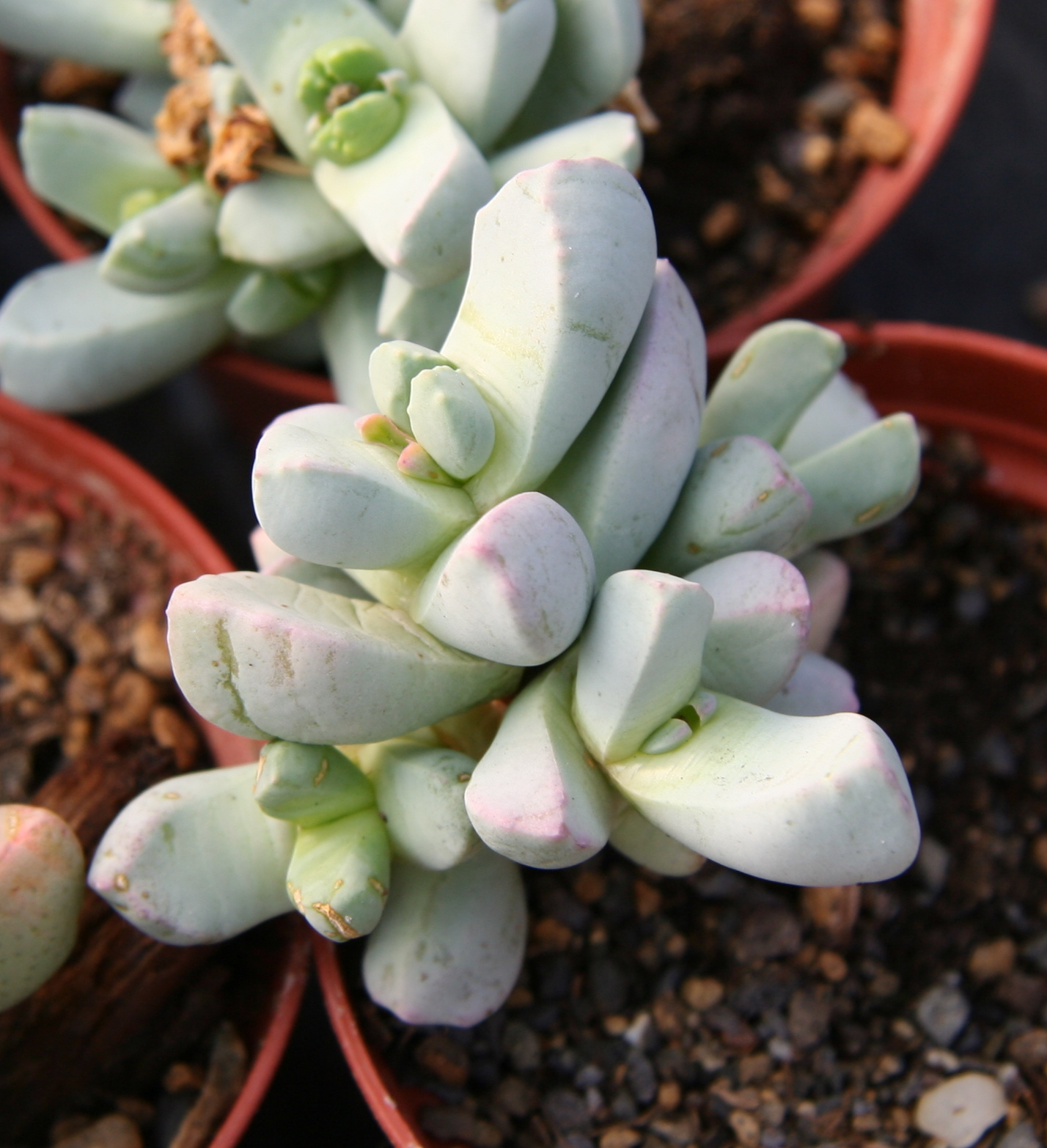
- Dracophilus dealbatus

Scientific classification
- Kingdom: Plantae
- Clade: Tracheophytes
- Clade: Angiosperms
- Clade: Eudicots
- Order: Caryophyllales
- Family: Aizoaceae
- Subfamily: Ruschioideae
- Tribe: Ruschieae
- Genus: Dracophilus (Schwantes) Dinter & Schwantes

= Dracophilus =

Genus of plants

Dracophilus is a genus of flowering plants belonging to the family Aizoaceae. It is native to Namibia and the western Cape Provinces of South Africa.

Species:

- Dracophilus dealbatus (N.E.Br.) Walgate
- Dracophilus delaetianus (Dinter) Dinter & Schwantes
