= Dicrocaulon =

Scientific classification
- Kingdom: Plantae
- Clade: Tracheophytes
- Clade: Angiosperms
- Clade: Eudicots
- Order: Caryophyllales
- Family: Aizoaceae
- Subfamily: Ruschioideae
- Tribe: Ruschieae
- Genus: Dicrocaulon; N.E.Br.

Genus of plants

Dicrocaulon is a genus of flowering plants belonging to the family Aizoaceae.

Its native range is the Cape Provinces.

Species:

- Dicrocaulon brevifolium N.E.Br.
- Dicrocaulon grandiflorum Ihlenf.
- Dicrocaulon humile N.E.Br.
- Dicrocaulon microstigma (L.Bolus) Ihlenf.
- Dicrocaulon nodosum (A.Berger) N.E.Br.
- Dicrocaulon ramulosum (L.Bolus) Ihlenf.
- Dicrocaulon spissum N.E.Br.
