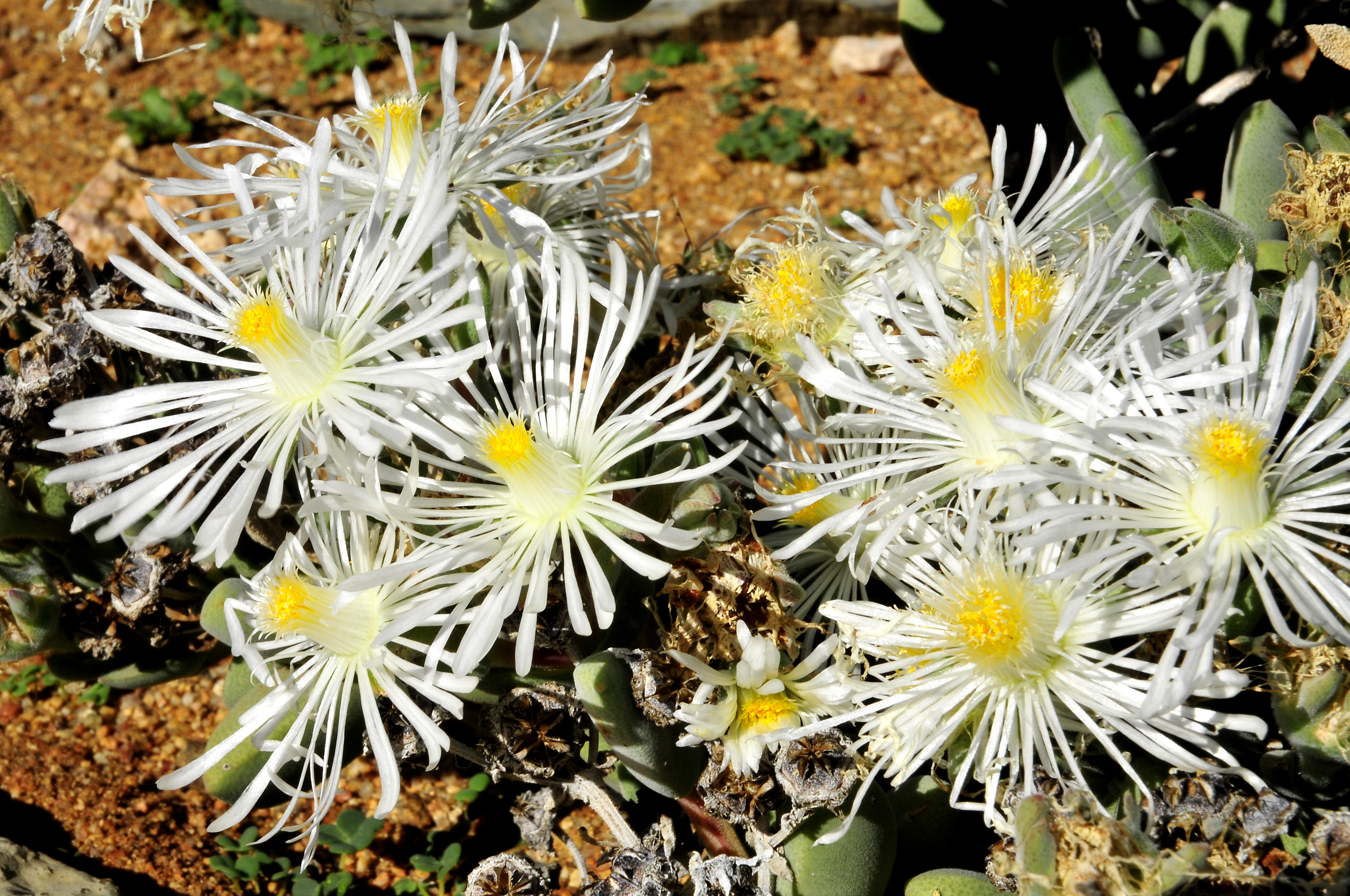

Scientific classification
- Kingdom: Plantae
- Clade: Tracheophytes
- Clade: Angiosperms
- Clade: Eudicots
- Order: Caryophyllales
- Family: Aizoaceae
- Subfamily: Ruschioideae
- Tribe: Ruschieae
- Genus: Wooleya; L.Bolus
- Species: W. farinosa

Binomial name
- Wooleya farinosa (L.Bolus) L.Bolus

Synonyms
- Namaquanthus farinosus L.Bolus

= Wooleya =

Species of flowering plant

Wooleya is a monotypic genus of flowering plants belonging to the family Aizoaceae. It only contains one known species, Wooleya farinosa. It is also in tribe Ruschieae.

It is native to the Cape Provinces in the South African Republic.

The genus name of Wooleya is in honour of Charles Hugh Frederick Wooley (1894–1969), an English naval officer, natural scientist and citrus grower. He also supplied Kirstenbosch National Botanical Garden with succulents from around South Africa. The Latin specific epithet of farinosa means farinaceous (having a floury texture or grainy) derived from farina meaning flour. It was first described and published in J. S. African Bot. Vol.27 on page 48 in 1960.
