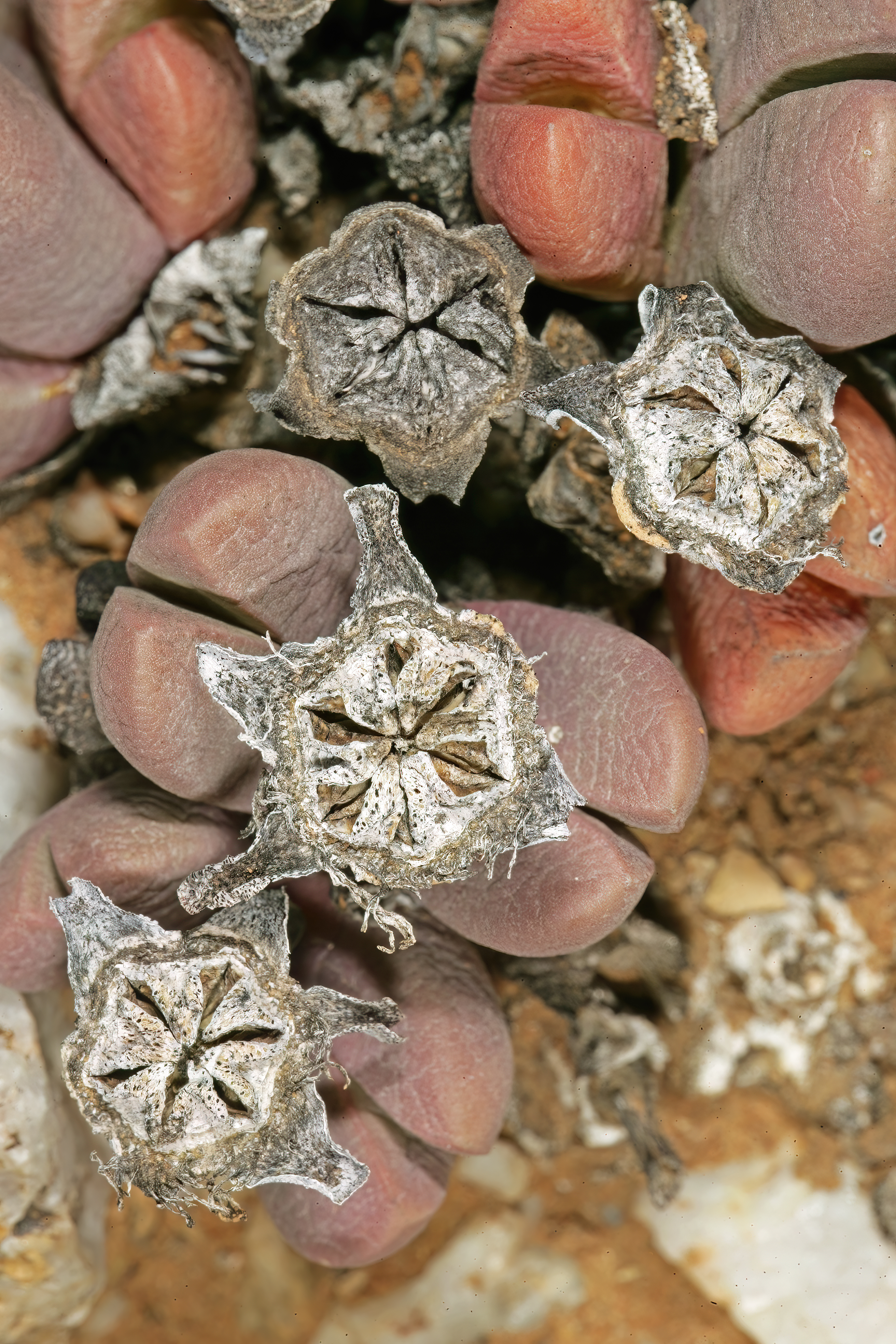
- Antegibbaeum fissoides in Anysberg Nature Reserve, South Africa

Scientific classification
- Kingdom: Plantae
- Clade: Tracheophytes
- Clade: Angiosperms
- Clade: Eudicots
- Order: Caryophyllales
- Family: Aizoaceae
- Subfamily: Ruschioideae
- Tribe: Ruschieae
- Genus: Antegibbaeum; Schwantes ex C.Weber
- Species: A. fissoides

Binomial name
- Antegibbaeum fissoides (Haw.) C.Weber

Synonyms
- Gibbaeum fissoides (Haw.) Nel; Gibbaeum nelii Schwantes ex H.Jacobsen; Mesembryanthemum divergens Kensit; Mesembryanthemum fissoides Haw. (1795) (basionym); Mesembryanthemum obtusum Haw.

= Antegibbaeum =

Genus of flowering plants

Antegibbaeum is a genus of flowering plants belonging to the family Aizoaceae. It contains a single species, Antegibbaeum fissoides, a succulent subshrub native to the southwestern Cape Provinces of South Africa.
