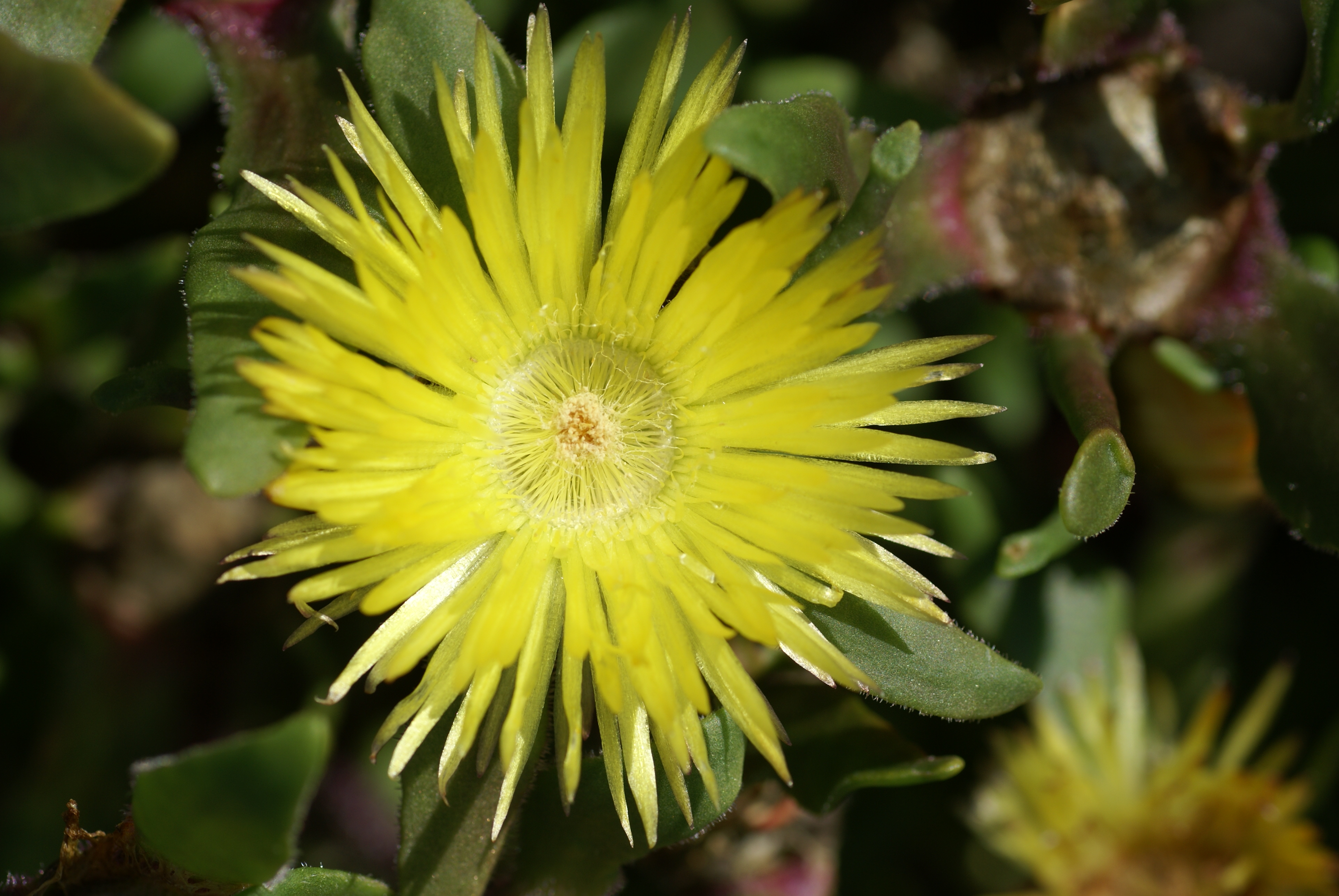
- Carpanthea pomeridiana

Scientific classification
- Kingdom: Plantae
- Clade: Embryophytes
- Clade: Tracheophytes
- Clade: Angiosperms
- Clade: Eudicots
- Order: Caryophyllales
- Family: Aizoaceae
- Subfamily: Ruschioideae
- Tribe: Apatesieae
- Genus: Carpanthea; N.E.Br.

Species
- See text

Synonyms
- Macrocaulon N.E.Br.

= Carpanthea =

Genus of flowering plants

Carpanthea, called vetkousie, is a genus of flowering plants in the iceplant family Aizoaceae, native to the southwest of the Cape Province of South Africa. Low-lying succulent annuals, their flowers and fruit are edible.

== Species ==
Currently accepted species include:

- Carpanthea calendulacea (Haw.) L.Bolus
- Carpanthea pomeridiana (L.) N.E.Br.
