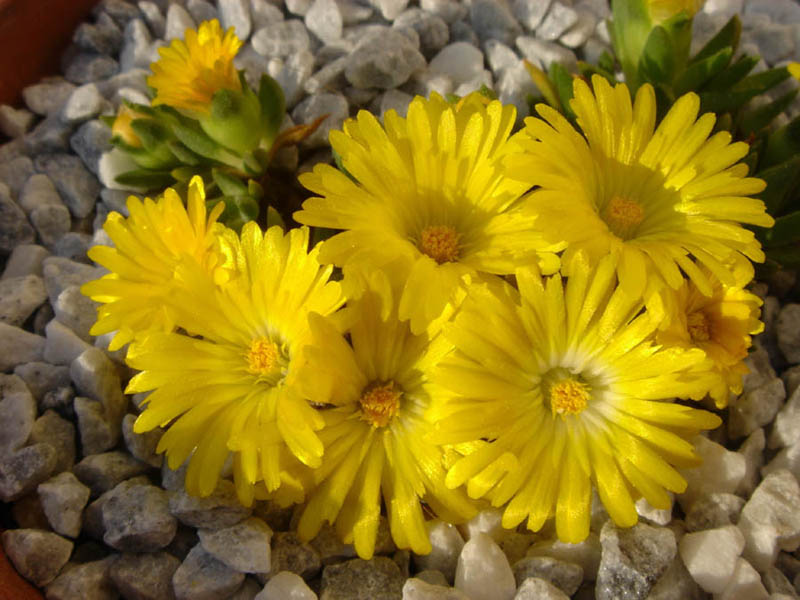
- Here given as Delosperma congestum

Scientific classification
- Kingdom: Plantae
- Clade: Embryophytes
- Clade: Tracheophytes
- Clade: Angiosperms
- Clade: Eudicots
- Order: Caryophyllales
- Family: Aizoaceae
- Subfamily: Ruschioideae
- Tribe: Ruschieae
- Genus: Malotigena; Niederle
- Species: M. frantiskae-niederlovae

Binomial name
- Malotigena frantiskae-niederlovae Niederle

= Malotigena =

Genus of flowering plants

Malotigena is a genus of flowering plants in the ice plant family Aizoaceae. It has only one currently accepted species, Malotigena frantiskae-niederlovae, native to Lesotho. Growing up to 50 cm (20 in) broad and only 3 cm (1.2 in) high, it is a mat-forming evergreen succulent with brilliant yellow daisy-like flowers in summer. The foliage turns red in autumn.

Its cultivar 'Gold Nugget' has gained the Royal Horticultural Society's Award of Garden Merit. Although hardy down to −10 °C (14 °F), it requires a sheltered spot in full sun, in acid or neutral pH soil, to thrive.
