= Apatesia =

Scientific classification
- Kingdom: Plantae
- Clade: Tracheophytes
- Clade: Angiosperms
- Clade: Eudicots
- Order: Caryophyllales
- Family: Aizoaceae
- Subfamily: Ruschioideae
- Tribe: Apatesieae
- Genus: Apatesia; N.E.Br.

Synonyms
- Thyrasperma N.E.Br.

Genus of flowering plants

Apatesia is a genus of flowering plants belonging to the family Aizoaceae. It includes three species native to the southwestern Cape Provinces of South Africa.

== Species ==
Three species are accepted.

- Apatesia helianthoides (Aiton) N.E.Br.
- Apatesia pillansii N.E.Br.
- Apatesia sabulosa (Thunb.) L.Bolus
