= Rabiea =

Scientific classification
- Kingdom: Plantae
- Clade: Tracheophytes
- Clade: Angiosperms
- Clade: Eudicots
- Order: Caryophyllales
- Family: Aizoaceae
- Subfamily: Ruschioideae
- Tribe: Ruschieae
- Genus: Rabiea; N.E.Br.

Genus of flowering plant

Rabiea is a genus of flowering plants belonging to the family Aizoaceae.

It is native to the Cape Provinces and Free State within South Africa.

The genus name of Rabiea is in honour of William Abbot Rabie (1869–1936), a South African clergyman and plant collector. It was first described and published in Gard. Chron., series 3, Vol.88 on page 279 in 1930.

== Known species ==
According to Kew:

- Rabiea albinota (Haw.) N.E.Br.
- Rabiea albipuncta (Haw.) N.E.Br.
- Rabiea comptonii (L.Bolus) L.Bolus
- Rabiea difformis (L.Bolus) L.Bolus
- Rabiea jamesii (L.Bolus) L.Bolus
- Rabiea lesliei N.E.Br.
