= Eberlanzia (plant) =

Scientific classification
- Kingdom: Plantae
- Clade: Embryophytes
- Clade: Tracheophytes
- Clade: Spermatophytes
- Clade: Angiosperms
- Clade: Eudicots
- Order: Caryophyllales
- Family: Aizoaceae
- Subfamily: Ruschioideae
- Tribe: Ruschieae
- Genus: Eberlanzia; Schwantes

Genus of plants

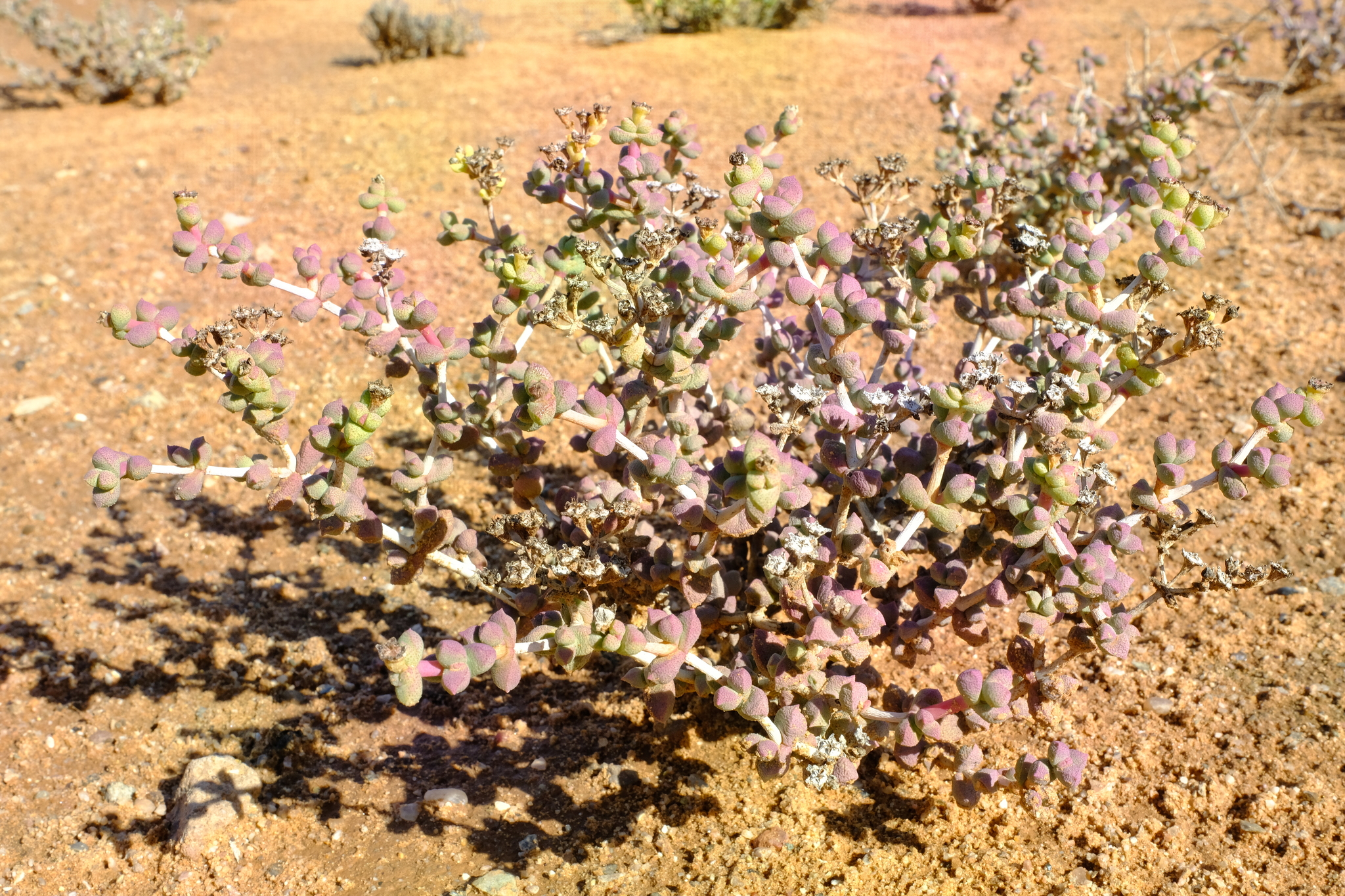
Eberlanzia schneideriana

Eberlanzia is a genus of flowering plants belonging to the family Aizoaceae. Its native range is Namibia and the Cape Provinces of South Africa.

The genus name of Eberlanzia is in honour of Friedrich Eberlanz, amateur naturalist of Lüderitz Bay in Namibia, and it was published and described in Z. Sukkulentenk Vol.2 on page 189 in 1926.

== Species ==
Ten species are accepted.

- Eberlanzia clausa (Dinter) Schwantes
- Eberlanzia cyathiformis (L.Bolus) H.E.K.Hartmann
- Eberlanzia dichotoma (L.Bolus) H.E.K.Hartmann
- Eberlanzia ebracteata (L.Bolus) H.E.K.Hartmann
- Eberlanzia gravida (L.Bolus) H.E.K.Hartmann
- Eberlanzia parvibracteata (L.Bolus) H.E.K.Hartmann
- Eberlanzia pillansii (L.Bolus) Klak & P.C.van Wyk
- Eberlanzia schneideriana (A.Berger) H.E.K.Hartmann
- Eberlanzia sedoides (Dinter & A.Berger) Schwantes
- Eberlanzia velutina (L.Bolus) Klak & P.C.van Wyk
