= Rhinephyllum =

Scientific classification
- Kingdom: Plantae
- Clade: Tracheophytes
- Clade: Angiosperms
- Clade: Eudicots
- Order: Caryophyllales
- Family: Aizoaceae
- Subfamily: Ruschioideae
- Tribe: Ruschieae
- Genus: Rhinephyllum; N.E.Br.

Synonyms
- Neorhine Schwantes

Genus of plants

Rhinephyllum is a genus of flowering plants belonging to the family Aizoaceae. It is native to Lesotho and the Cape Provinces and Free State of South Africa.

== Species ==
11 species are accepted.

- Rhinephyllum broomii L.Bolus
- Rhinephyllum comptonii L.Bolus
- Rhinephyllum graniforme (Haw.) L.Bolus
- Rhinephyllum inaequale L.Bolus
- Rhinephyllum luteum (L.Bolus) L.Bolus
- Rhinephyllum muirii N.E.Br.
- Rhinephyllum obliquum L.Bolus
- Rhinephyllum parvifolium L.Bolus
- Rhinephyllum pillansii N.E.Br.
- Rhinephyllum schonlandii L.Bolus
- Rhinephyllum verdoorniae (N.E.Br.) H.E.K.Hartmann
