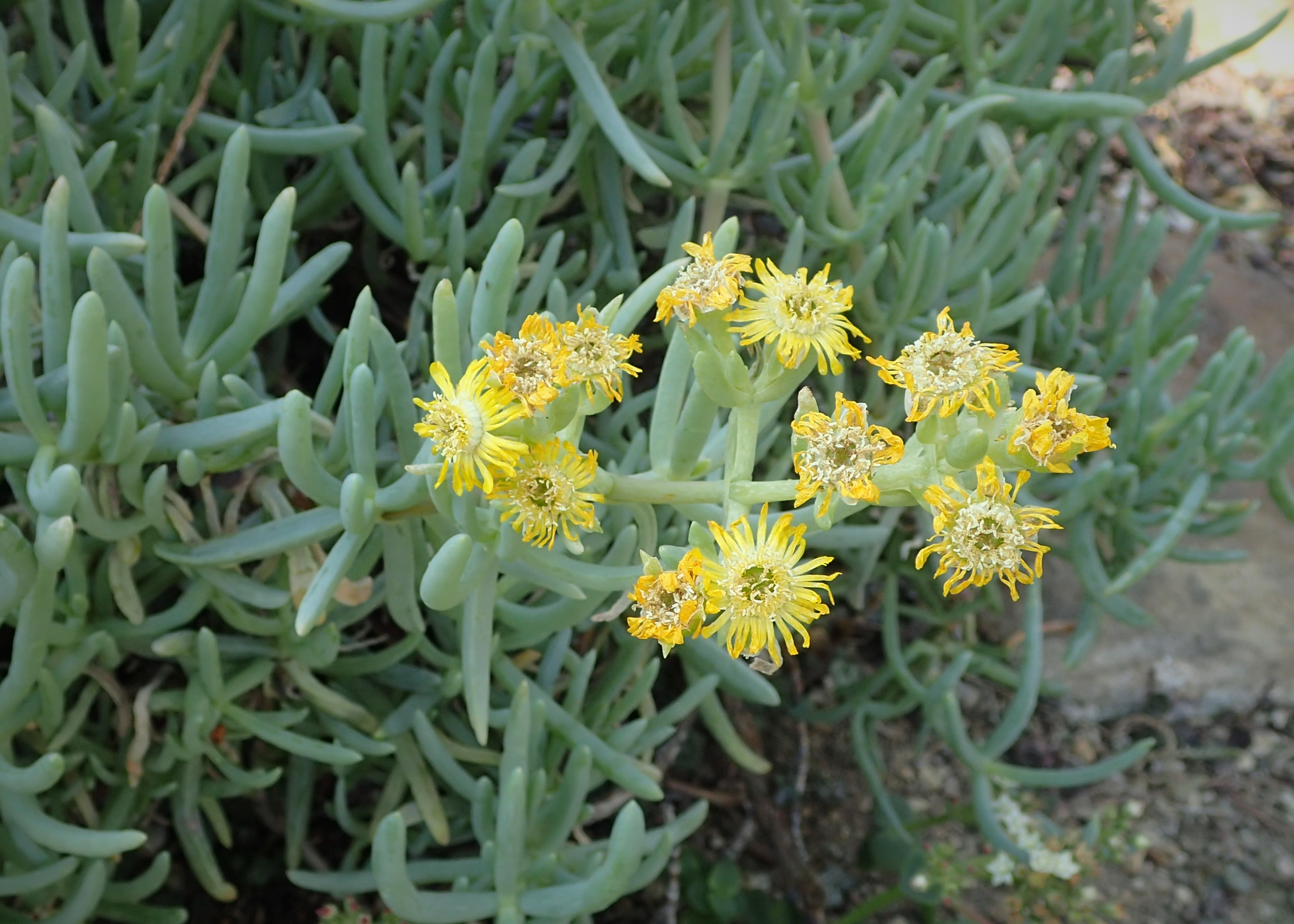

Scientific classification
- Kingdom: Plantae
- Clade: Tracheophytes
- Clade: Angiosperms
- Clade: Eudicots
- Order: Caryophyllales
- Family: Aizoaceae
- Subfamily: Ruschioideae
- Tribe: Ruschieae
- Genus: Scopelogena; L.Bolus ex A.G.J.Herre

= Scopelogena =

Genus of plants

Scopelogena is a genus of flowering plants belonging to the family Aizoaceae. It is endemic to the Cape Provinces of South Africa.

== Species ==
Two species are accepted.

- Scopelogena bruynsii Klak
- Scopelogena verruculata (L.) L.Bolus ex Klak
