= Hereroa =

Scientific classification
- Kingdom: Plantae
- Clade: Tracheophytes
- Clade: Angiosperms
- Clade: Eudicots
- Order: Caryophyllales
- Family: Aizoaceae
- Subfamily: Ruschioideae
- Tribe: Ruschieae
- Genus: Hereroa (Schwantes) Dinter & Schwantes

Genus of plants

Hereroa is a genus of flowering plants belonging to the family Aizoaceae. It is native to Namibia and the Cape Provinces, Free State, and Northern Provinces of South Africa.

== Species ==
28 species are accepted.

- Hereroa acuminata L.Bolus
- Hereroa aspera L.Bolus
- Hereroa brevifolia L.Bolus
- Hereroa calycina L.Bolus
- Hereroa carinans (Haw.) Dinter & Schwantes ex H.Jacobsen
- Hereroa concava L.Bolus
- Hereroa crassa L.Bolus
- Hereroa fimbriata L.Bolus
- Hereroa glenensis (N.E.Br.) L.Bolus
- Hereroa gracilis L.Bolus
- Hereroa granulata (N.E.Br.) Dinter & Schwantes
- Hereroa herrei Schwantes
- Hereroa hesperantha (Dinter & A.Berger) Dinter & Schwantes
- Hereroa incurva L.Bolus
- Hereroa joubertii L.Bolus
- Hereroa latipetala L.Bolus
- Hereroa muirii L.Bolus
- Hereroa nelii Schwantes
- Hereroa odorata L.Bolus
- Hereroa pallens L.Bolus
- Hereroa puttkameriana (Dinter & A.Berger) Dinter & Schwantes
- Hereroa rehneltiana (A.Berger) Dinter & Schwantes
- Hereroa stanfordiae L.Bolus
- Hereroa stenophylla L.Bolus
- Hereroa tenuifolia L.Bolus
- Hereroa teretifolia L.Bolus
- Hereroa willowmorensis L.Bolus
- Hereroa wilmaniae L.Bolus
