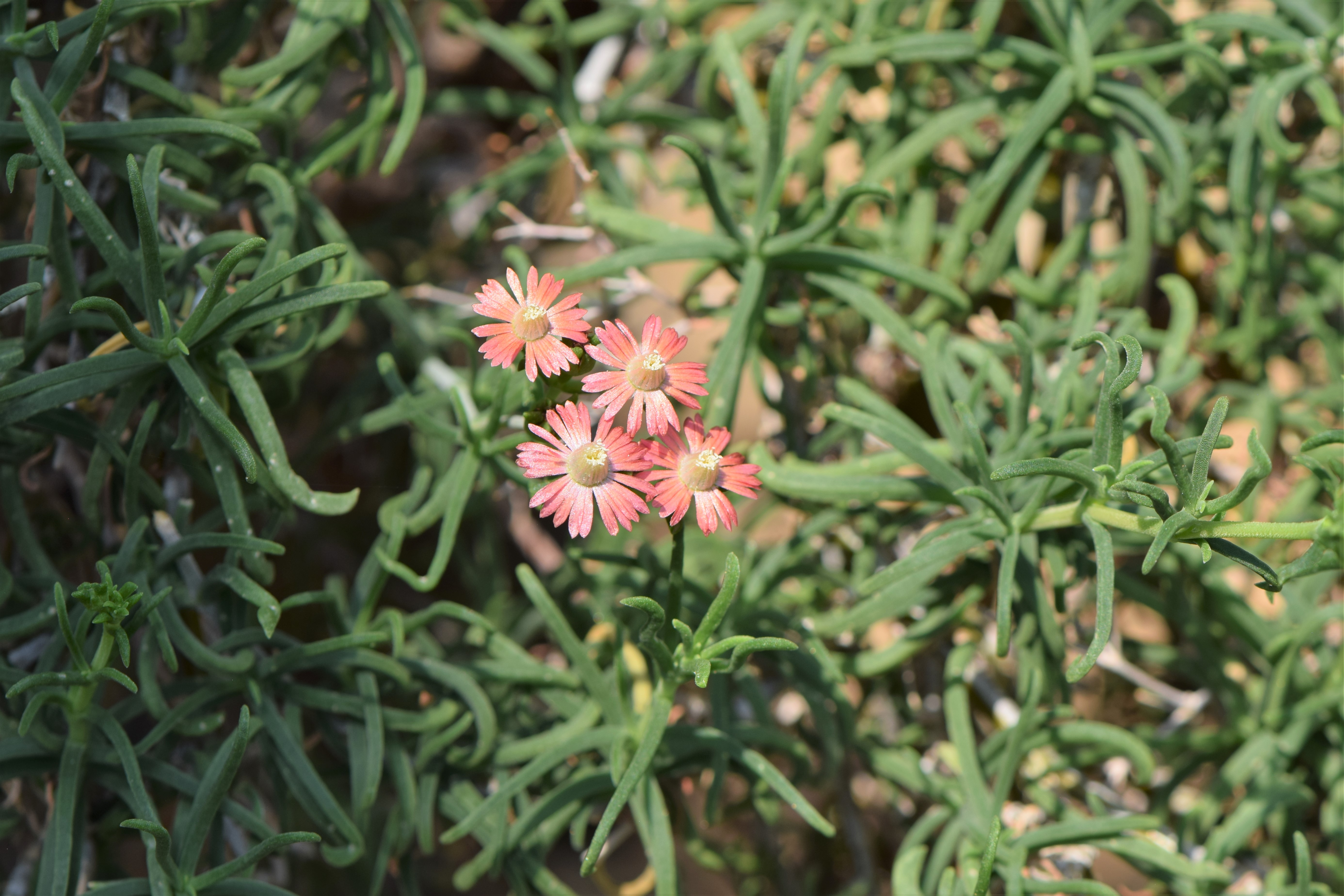
- Mestoklema tuberosum

Scientific classification
- Kingdom: Plantae
- Clade: Tracheophytes
- Clade: Angiosperms
- Clade: Eudicots
- Order: Caryophyllales
- Family: Aizoaceae
- Subfamily: Ruschioideae
- Tribe: Ruschieae
- Genus: Mestoklema; N.E.Br. ex Glen

= Mestoklema =

Genus of plants

Mestoklema is a genus of flowering plants belonging to the family Aizoaceae. It is native to Namibia and to the Cape Provinces and Free State of South Africa.

== Species ==
Six species are accepted:

- Mestoklema albanicum N.E.Br. ex Glen
- Mestoklema arboriforme (Burch.) N.E.Br. ex Glen
- Mestoklema copiosum N.E.Br. ex Glen
- Mestoklema elatum N.E.Br. ex Glen
- Mestoklema illepidum N.E.Br. ex Glen
- Mestoklema tuberosum (L.) N.E.Br. ex Glen
