= Jacobsenia =

Scientific classification
- Kingdom: Plantae
- Clade: Tracheophytes
- Clade: Angiosperms
- Clade: Eudicots
- Order: Caryophyllales
- Family: Aizoaceae
- Subfamily: Ruschioideae
- Tribe: Ruschieae
- Genus: Jacobsenia; L.Bolus & Schwantes

Genus of plants

Jacobsenia is a genus of flowering plants belonging to the family Aizoaceae.

It is native to the Cape Provinces in the South African Republic.

The genus name of Jacobsenia is in honour of Hermann Jacobsen (1898–1978), a German gardener and botanist. He was also curator and supervisor at a botanical garden in Kiel and specialist in succulents. It was first described and published Kakteen And. Sukk. Vol.5 on page 69 in 1954.

Species, according to Kew;

- Jacobsenia hallii L.Bolus
- Jacobsenia kolbei (L.Bolus) L.Bolus & Schwantes
