= Diplosoma (plant) =

Scientific classification
- Kingdom: Plantae
- Clade: Tracheophytes
- Clade: Angiosperms
- Clade: Eudicots
- Order: Caryophyllales
- Family: Aizoaceae
- Subfamily: Ruschioideae
- Tribe: Ruschieae
- Genus: Diplosoma; Schwantes

Synonyms
- Maughania N.E.Br.; Maughaniella L.Bolus

Genus of plants

Diplosoma is a genus of flowering plants belonging to the family Aizoaceae. It is native to the southwestern Cape Provinces of South Africa.

Species:

- Diplosoma luckhoffii (L.Bolus) Schwantes ex Ihlenf.
- Diplosoma retroversum (Kensit) Schwantes
