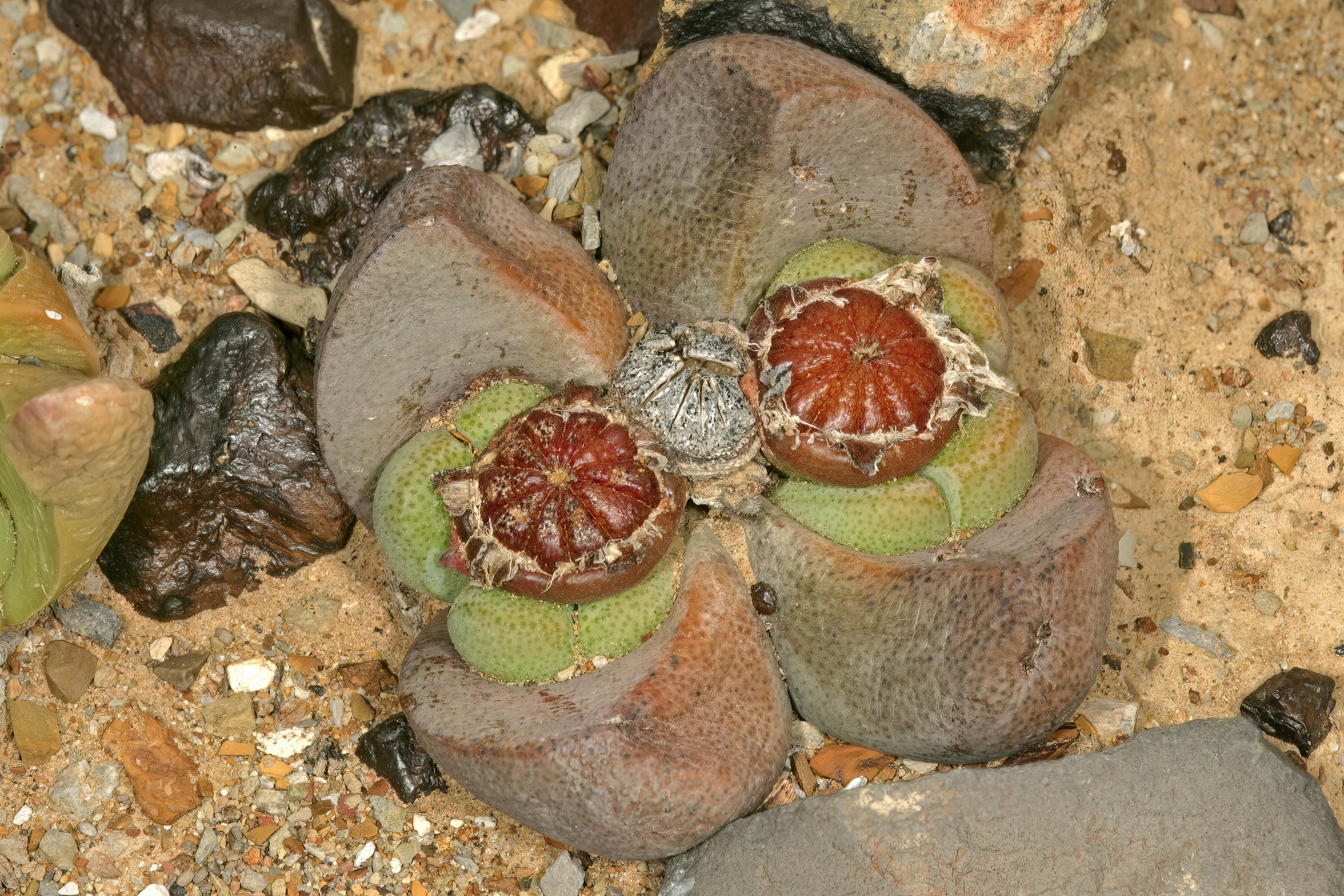
- Tanquana prismatica

Scientific classification
- Kingdom: Plantae
- Clade: Tracheophytes
- Clade: Angiosperms
- Clade: Eudicots
- Order: Caryophyllales
- Family: Aizoaceae
- Subfamily: Ruschioideae
- Tribe: Ruschieae
- Genus: Tanquana; H.Hartmann & Liede

= Tanquana =

Genus of flowering plants

Tanquana is a genus of flowering plants belonging to the family Aizoaceae. It is native to the Cape Provinces of South Africa.

== Description ==
Plants are compact and low-growing, either unbranched or forming small clusters, and may grow partly sunken into the ground or just above the soil surface. During the resting period, only a single pair of leaves persists. Leaves are thick, fleshy, and typically rounded at the tips, with surfaces appearing punctate due to idioblasts visible beneath the epidermis. Leaf pairs are usually anisophyllous, though nearly isophyllous forms occur in some species.

Each plant produces a single flower per growth cycle. Flowers are yellow, with 30–70 petals, and open around midday. The calyx consists of 4–5 sepals, and the stamens are papillate at the base.

=== Taxonomic note ===
Tanquana was formerly included in Pleiospilos due to the presence of dotted leaves, but was segregated as a distinct genus based on differences in growth form, floral structure, fruit morphology, and ecology.

== Distribution ==
Species are substrate specialists, growing almost exclusively on Dwyka and Ecca shales, with T. hilmarii additionally confined to vertical shale bands of the Witteberg Group. Plants typically inhabit rocky slopes, shale flats, or shale clefts, where soil is shallow and drainage is rapid. Rainfall is low (around 200 mm annually) and falls mainly in winter, though occasional precipitation may occur in early autumn or spring depending on species and locality.

== Species ==
Three species are accepted.

- Tanquana archeri (L.Bolus) H.Hartmann & Liede
- Tanquana hilmarii (L.Bolus) H.Hartmann & Liede
- Tanquana prismatica (Schwantes) H.Hartmann & Liede
