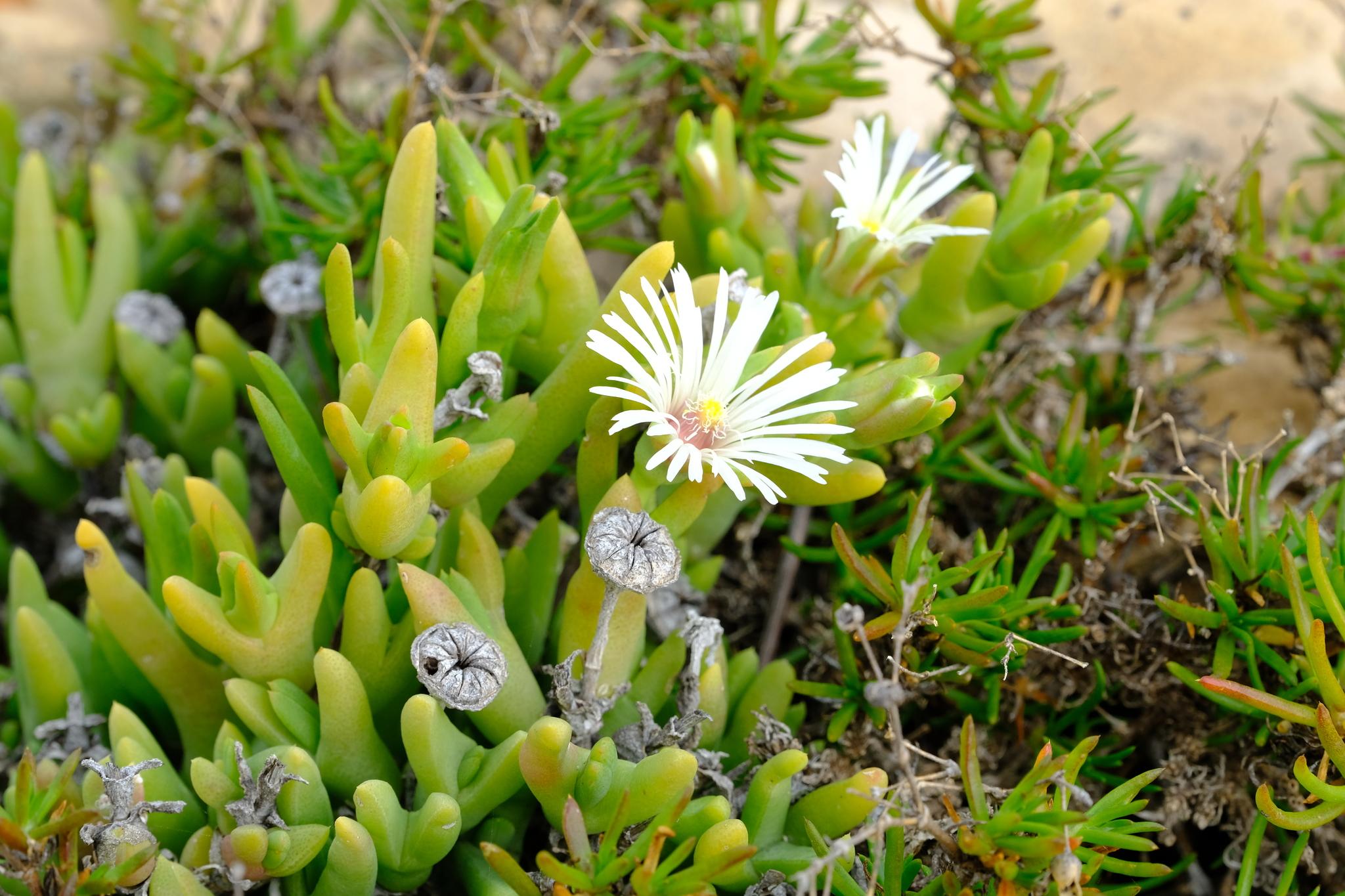
- Vanzijlia annulata

Scientific classification
- Kingdom: Plantae
- Clade: Embryophytes
- Clade: Tracheophytes
- Clade: Angiosperms
- Clade: Eudicots
- Order: Caryophyllales
- Family: Aizoaceae
- Subfamily: Ruschioideae
- Tribe: Ruschieae
- Genus: Vanzijlia; L.Bolus
- Species: V. annulata

Binomial name
- Vanzijlia annulata (A.Berger) L.Bolus

Synonyms
- Species synonymy: Mesembryanthemum angustipetalum L.Bolus; Mesembryanthemum annulatum A.Berger; Vanzijlia angustipetala (L.Bolus) N.E.Br.

= Vanzijlia =

Genus of flowering plants

Vanzijlia is a genus of flowering plants belonging to the family Aizoaceae. It only contains one known species, Vanzijlia annulata.

It is native to the Cape Provinces of the South African Republic.

The genus name of Vanzijlia is in honour of Dorothy Constantia van Zijl (1886–1938), South African plant collector. The Latin specific epithet of annulata means ring-shaped or with an annulus. Both the genus and the species were first described and published in Fl. Pl. South Africa Vol.7 on table 262 in 1927. The genus is recognized by the United States Department of Agriculture and the Agricultural Research Service, but they do not list any known species.
