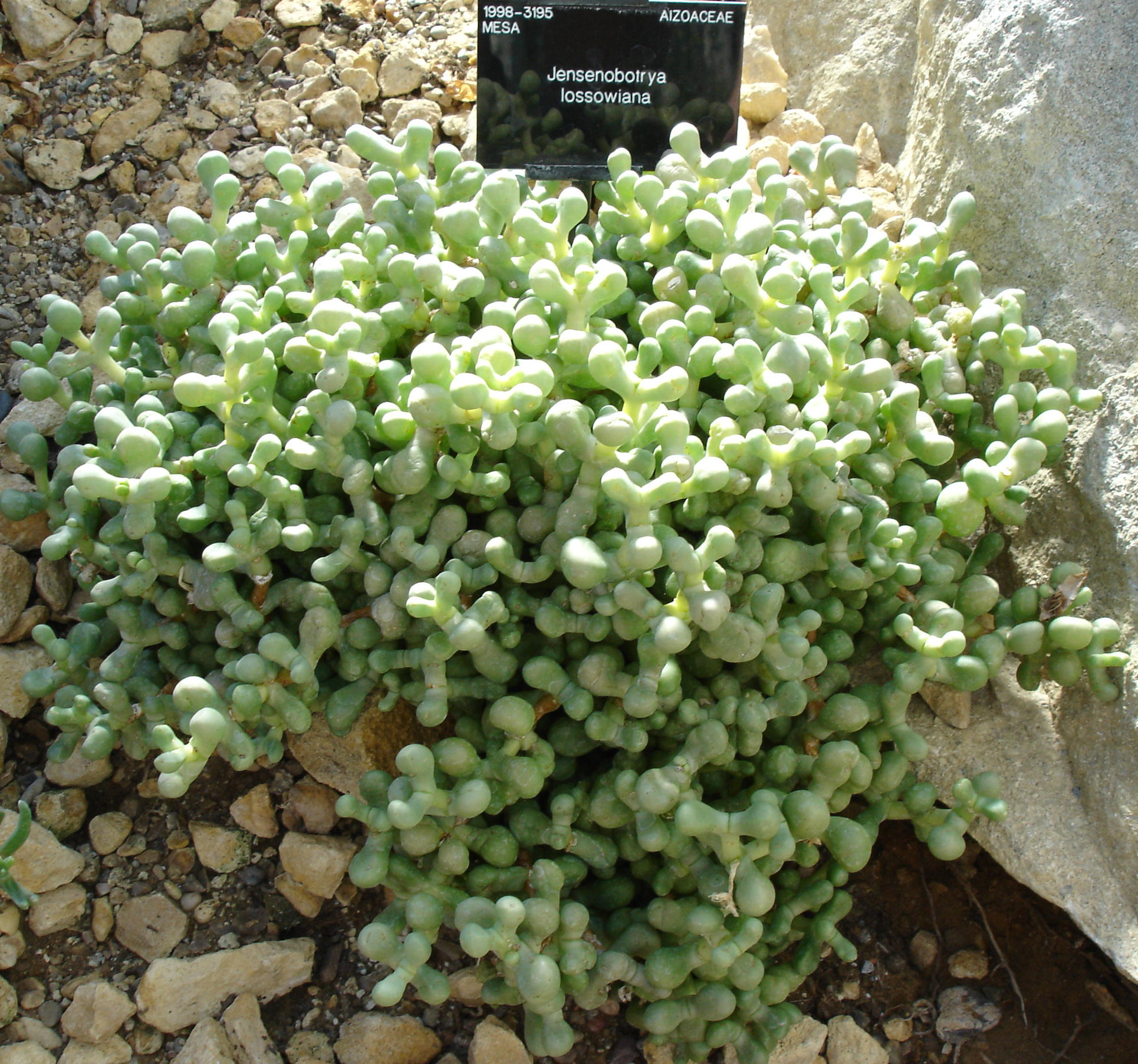

Conservation status
- Vulnerable (IUCN 3.1)

Scientific classification
- Kingdom: Plantae
- Clade: Tracheophytes
- Clade: Angiosperms
- Clade: Eudicots
- Order: Caryophyllales
- Family: Aizoaceae
- Subfamily: Ruschioideae
- Tribe: Ruschieae
- Genus: Jensenobotrya; A.G.J.Herre
- Species: J. lossowiana

Binomial name
- Jensenobotrya lossowiana A.G.J.Herre

= Jensenobotrya =

Genus of succulents

Jensenobotrya lossowiana is the only species of genus Jensenobotrya, in the family Aizoaceae. It is a succulent plant endemic to Namibia. Its natural habitat is rocky areas. It grows at Dolphin Head in Spencer Bay where it obtains moisture from the saline mists. It is threatened by habitat loss.

Jensenobotrya is named after Emil Jensen and the Greek βότρυς - botrys (bunch of grapes), because the leaves look like grapes. The vernacular name druiwetrosvygie means 'bunch of grapes mesemb'.
