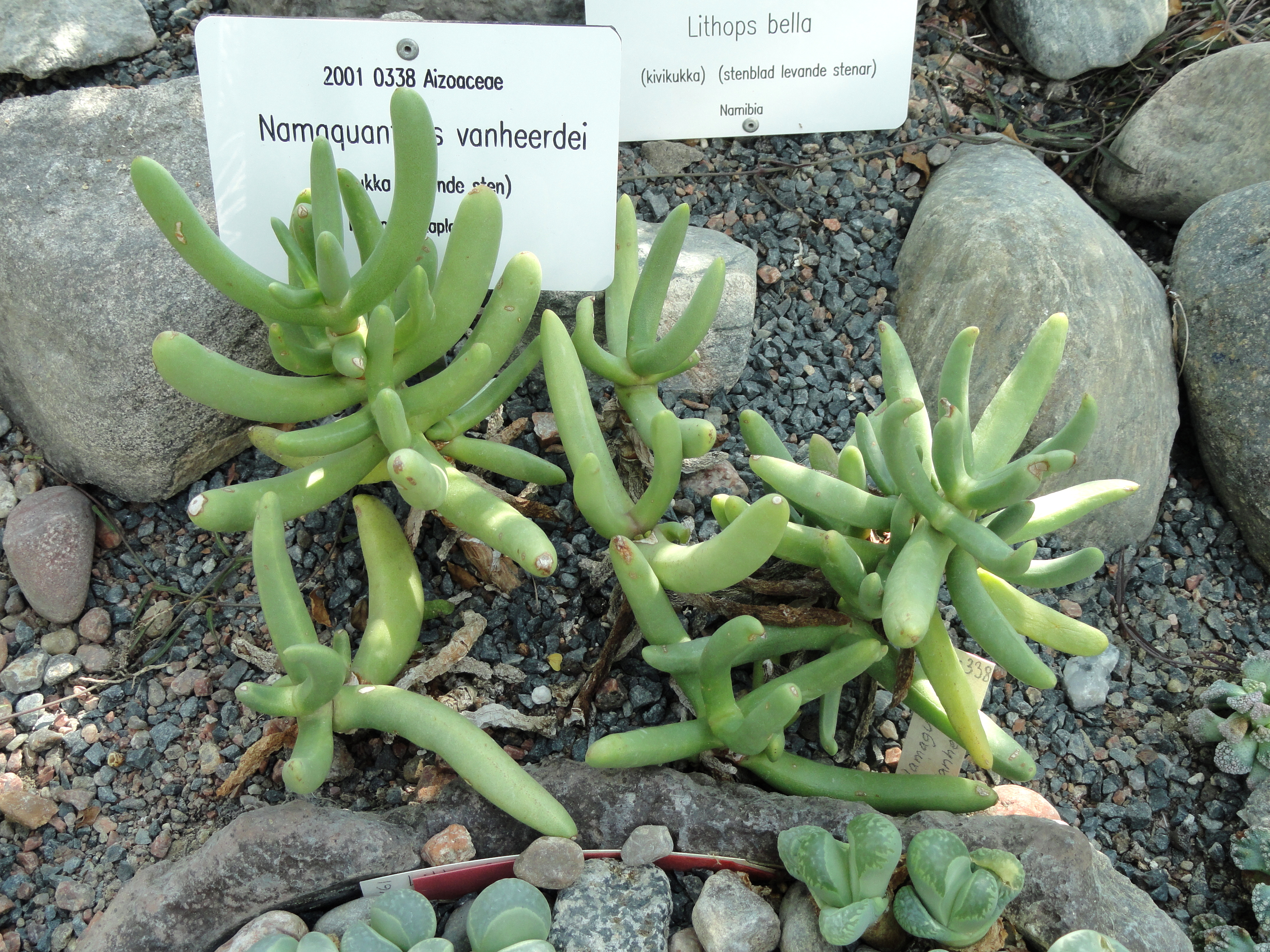
- Namaquanthus vanheerdei in Helsinki

Scientific classification
- Kingdom: Plantae
- Clade: Tracheophytes
- Clade: Angiosperms
- Clade: Eudicots
- Order: Caryophyllales
- Family: Aizoaceae
- Subfamily: Ruschioideae
- Tribe: Ruschieae
- Genus: Namaquanthus; L.Bolus

Species
- Namaquanthus cephalophylloides Klak; Namaquanthus vanheerdei L.Bolus

= Namaquanthus =

Genus of plants

Namaquanthus is a genus of flowering plants belonging to the family Aizoaceae. It includes two species native to the northern Cape Provinces of South Africa

- Namaquanthus cephalophylloides Klak
- Namaquanthus vanheerdei L.Bolus
