= Ruschianthus =

Conservation status
- Vulnerable (IUCN 3.1)

Scientific classification
- Kingdom: Plantae
- Clade: Tracheophytes
- Clade: Angiosperms
- Clade: Eudicots
- Order: Caryophyllales
- Family: Aizoaceae
- Subfamily: Ruschioideae
- Tribe: Ruschieae
- Genus: Ruschianthus; L.Bolus
- Species: R. falcatus

Binomial name
- Ruschianthus falcatus L.Bolus

Genus of succulents

Ruschianthus falcatus is a species of plant in the family Aizoaceae. It is endemic to Namibia. Its natural habitat is rocky areas. It is the only species in the monotypic genus Ruschianthus.
