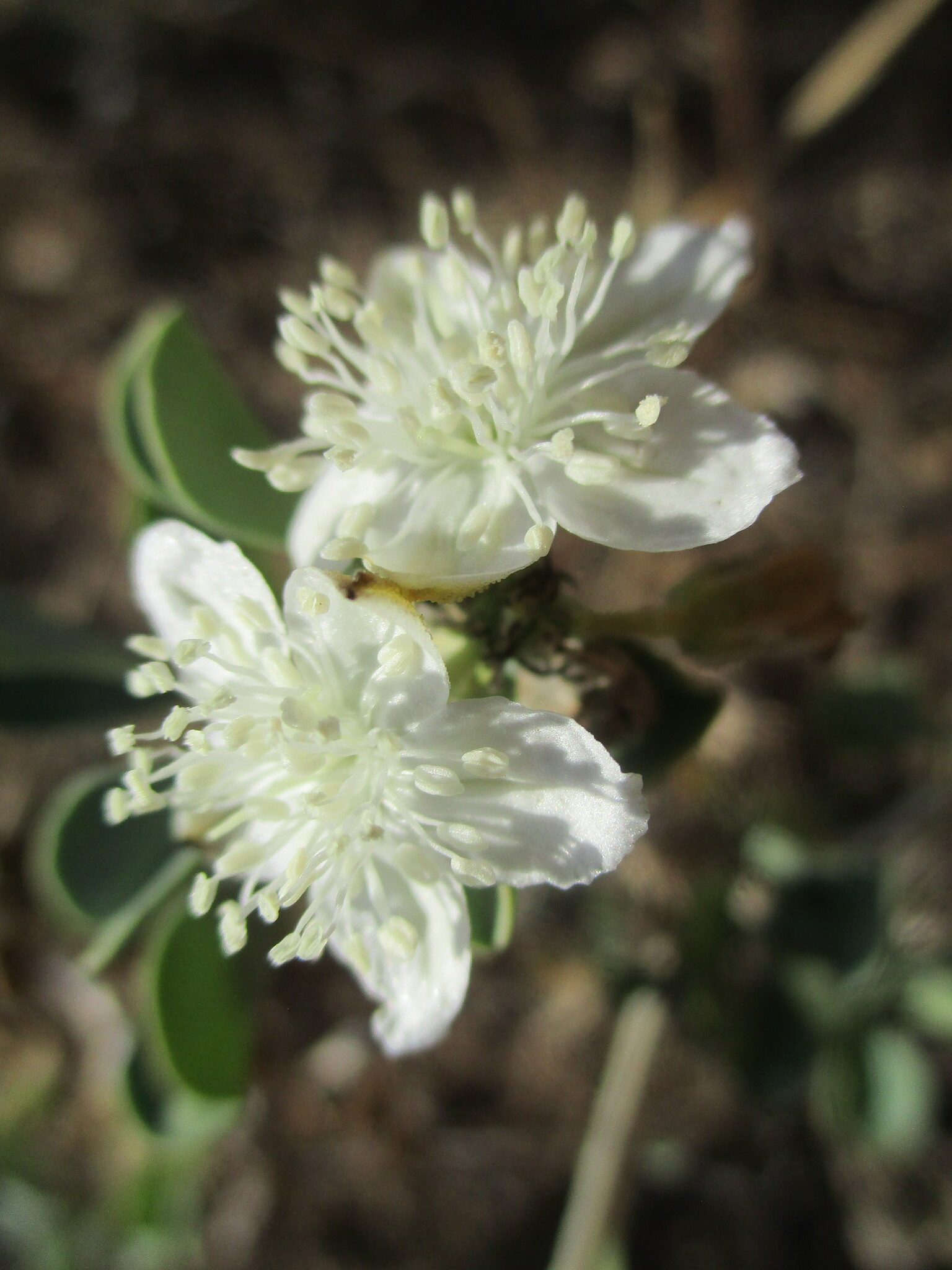
- Tribulocarpus dimorphanthus in Namibia

Scientific classification
- Kingdom: Plantae
- Clade: Tracheophytes
- Clade: Angiosperms
- Clade: Eudicots
- Order: Caryophyllales
- Family: Aizoaceae
- Tribe: Anisostigmateae
- Genus: Tribulocarpus; S.Moore

= Tribulocarpus =

Genus of flowering plants

Tribulocarpus is a genus of flowering plants belonging to the family Aizoaceae.

Its native range is Ethiopia to Southern Africa.

== Species ==
Three species are accepted.

- Tribulocarpus dimorphanthus (Pax) S.Moore
- Tribulocarpus retusus (Thulin) Thulin & Liede
- Tribulocarpus somalensis (Engl.) Sukhor.
