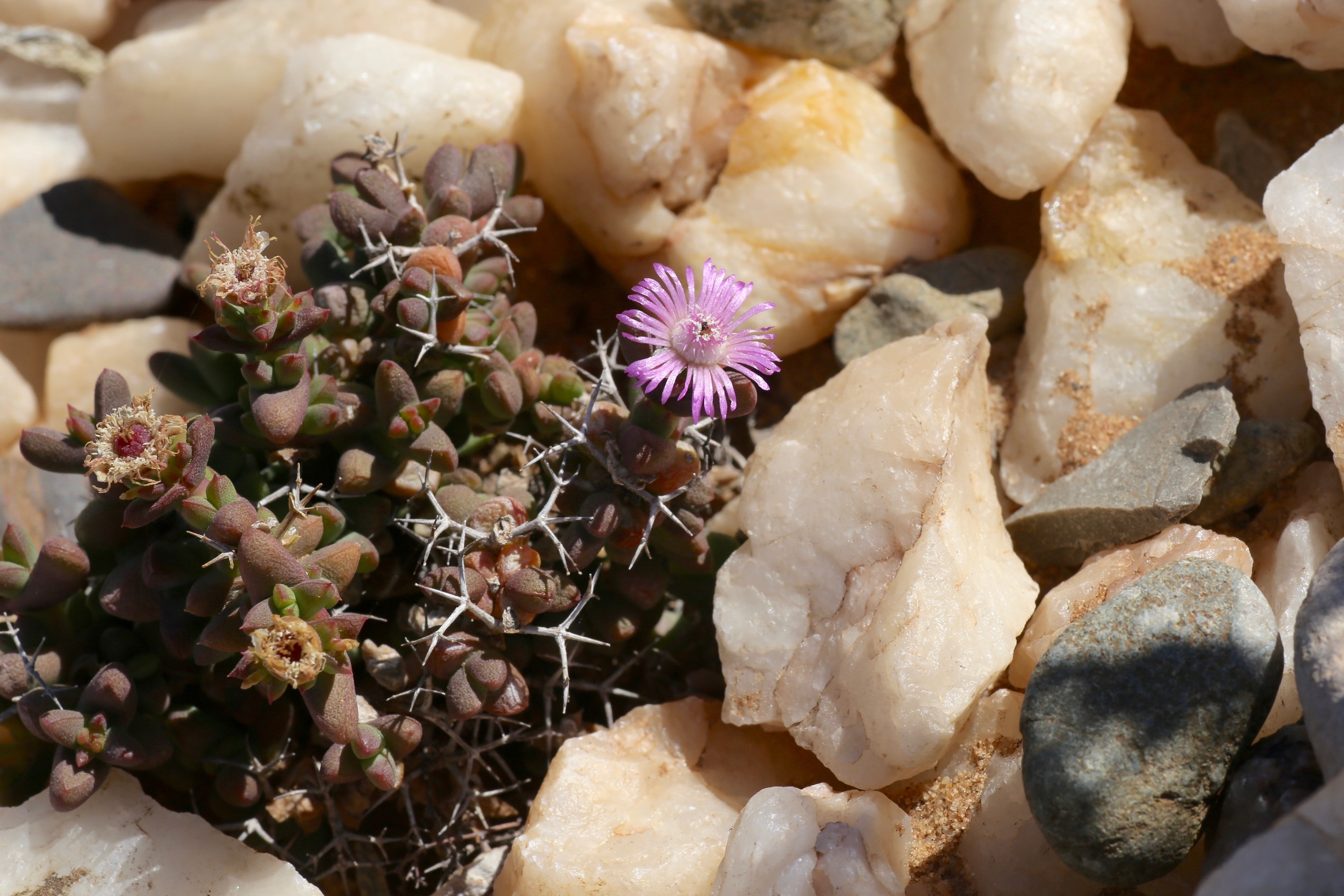
- Schlechteranthus stylosus

Scientific classification
- Kingdom: Plantae
- Clade: Tracheophytes
- Clade: Angiosperms
- Clade: Eudicots
- Order: Caryophyllales
- Family: Aizoaceae
- Subfamily: Ruschioideae
- Tribe: Ruschieae
- Genus: Schlechteranthus; Schwantes

Synonyms
- Polymita N.E.Br.

= Schlechteranthus =

Genus of flowering plant

Schlechteranthus is a genus of flowering plants belonging to the family Aizoaceae.

It is native to the Cape Provinces within the South African Republic.

The genus name of Schlechteranthus is in honour of Max Schlechter (1874–1960), brother and colleague of Rudolf Schlechter (a German taxonomist, botanist, and author of several works on orchids). While, Max was a German collector of natural history specimens. It was first described and published in Monatsschr. Deutsch. Kakteen-Ges. Vol.1 on page 16 in 1929.

== Species ==
According to Kew:

- Schlechteranthus abruptus (A.Berger) R.F.Powell
- Schlechteranthus albiflorus (L.Bolus) Klak
- Schlechteranthus connatus (L.Bolus) R.F.Powell
- Schlechteranthus diutinus (L.Bolus) Klak
- Schlechteranthus hallii L.Bolus
- Schlechteranthus holgatensis Klak
- Schlechteranthus inclusus (L.Bolus) R.F.Powell
- Schlechteranthus maximiliani Schwantes
- Schlechteranthus parvus R.F.Powell & Klak
- Schlechteranthus pungens (H.E.K.Hartmann) R.F.Powell
- Schlechteranthus spinescens (L.Bolus) R.F.Powell
- Schlechteranthus steenbokensis (H.E.K.Hartmann) Klak
- Schlechteranthus stylosus (L.Bolus) R.F.Powell
- Schlechteranthus subglobosus (L.Bolus) R.F.Powell
- Schlechteranthus tetrasepalus (L.Bolus) R.F.Powell
