= Octopoma =

Scientific classification
- Kingdom: Plantae
- Clade: Tracheophytes
- Clade: Angiosperms
- Clade: Eudicots
- Order: Caryophyllales
- Family: Aizoaceae
- Subfamily: Ruschioideae
- Tribe: Ruschieae
- Genus: Octopoma; N.E.Br.

Genus of plants

Octopoma is a genus of flowering plants belonging to the family Aizoaceae. It includes four species native to the Cape Provinces of South Africa.

== Species ==
Four species are accepted:

- Octopoma nanum (L.Bolus) Klak
- Octopoma octojuge (L.Bolus) N.E.Br.
- Octopoma quadrisepalum (L.Bolus) H.E.K.Hartmann
- Octopoma tanquanum Klak
