= Esterhuysenia =

Scientific classification
- Kingdom: Plantae
- Clade: Embryophytes
- Clade: Tracheophytes
- Clade: Spermatophytes
- Clade: Angiosperms
- Clade: Eudicots
- Order: Caryophyllales
- Family: Aizoaceae
- Subfamily: Ruschioideae
- Tribe: Ruschieae
- Genus: Esterhuysenia; L.Bolus

Genus of plants

Esterhuysenia is a genus of flowering plants belonging to the family Aizoaceae.

It is native to the Cape Provinces of South Africa.

The genus name of Esterhuysenia is in honour of Elsie Elizabeth Esterhuysen (1912–2006), a South African botanist, and it was first described and published in J. S. African Bot. Vol.33 on page 308 in 1967.

Known species:

- Esterhuysenia alpina L.Bolus
- Esterhuysenia drepanophylla (Schltr. & A.Berger) H.E.K.Hartmann
- Esterhuysenia inclaudens (L.Bolus) H.E.K.Hartmann
- Esterhuysenia knysnana (L.Bolus) van Jaarsv.
- Esterhuysenia mucronata (L.Bolus) Klak
- Esterhuysenia stokoei (L.Bolus) H.E.K.Hartmann
