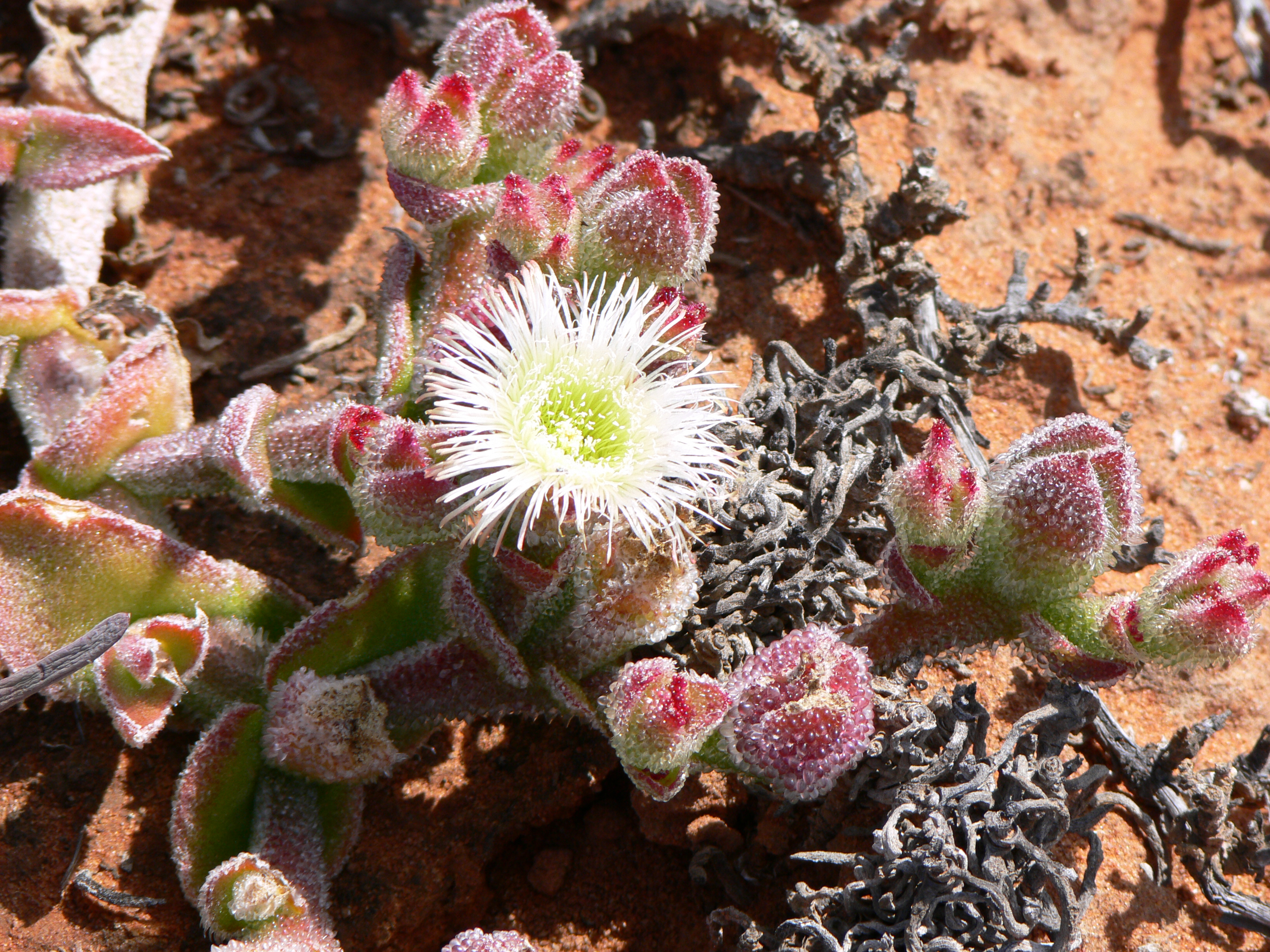
- Mesembryanthemum crystallinum

Scientific classification
- Kingdom: Plantae
- Clade: Embryophytes
- Clade: Tracheophytes
- Clade: Angiosperms
- Clade: Eudicots
- Order: Caryophyllales
- Family: Aizoaceae; Martinov

Type genus
- Aizoon L.

Genera
- See text

Synonyms
- Ficoidaceae; Mesembryanthemaceae; Tetragoniaceae Lindl.

= Aizoaceae =

Family of dicotyledonous flowering plants

The Aizoaceae (/ˌeɪzoʊˈeɪsi.iː, -ˌaɪ/), or fig-marigold family, are a large family of dicotyledonous flowering plants containing 135 genera and about 1,800 species. Several genera are commonly named ice plants or carpet weeds. The Aizoaceae are also referred to as vygies in South Africa. Some of the unusual Southern African genera—such as Conophytum, Lithops, Titanopsis, and Pleiospilos (among others)—resemble gemstones, rocks, or pebbles, and are sometimes called living stones or mesembs (short for mesembryanthemums).

== Description ==
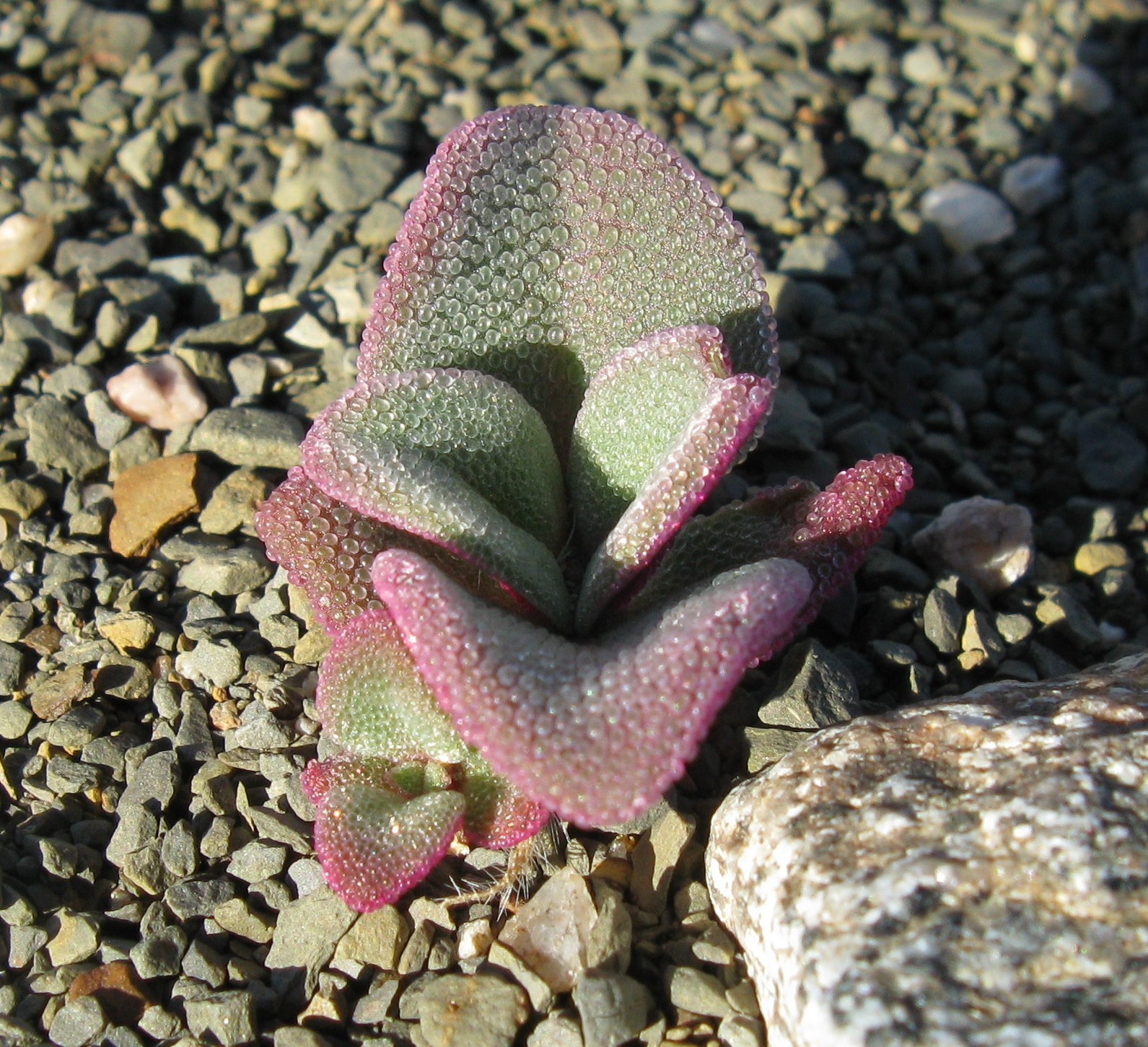
Mesembryanthemum guerichianum seedling, showing the epidermal bladder cells that inspired the name "ice plant"

Pronunciation of the South African colloquial name, Vygie, for Aizoaceae

The family Aizoaceae is widely recognised by taxonomists. It once went by the botanical name "Ficoidaceae", now disallowed. The APG II system of 2003 (unchanged from the APG system of 1998) also recognizes the family, and assigns it to the order Caryophyllales in the clade core eudicots. The APG II system also classes the former families Mesembryanthemaceae Fenzl, Sesuviaceae Horan. and Tetragoniaceae Link under the family Aizoaceae.

The common Afrikaans name "vygie" meaning "small fig" refers to the fruiting capsule, which resembles the true fig. Glistening epidermal bladder cells give the family its common name "ice plants".

Most fig-marigolds are herbaceous, rarely somewhat woody, with sympodial growth and stems either erect or prostrate. Leaves are simple, opposite or alternate, and more or less succulent with entire (or rarely toothed) margins. Flowers are perfect in most species (but unisexual in some), actinomorphic, and appear singularly or in few-flowered cymes developing from the leaf axils. Sepals are typically five (3–8) and more or less connate (fused) below. True petals are absent. However, some species have numerous linear petals derived from staminodes. The seed capsules have one to numerous seeds per cell and are often hygrochastic, dispersing seeds by "jet action" when wet.

== Distribution ==
Most species (96%, 1782 species in 132 genera) in this family are endemic to arid or semiarid parts of Southern Africa in the Succulent Karoo. Much of the Aizoaceae's diversity is found in the Greater Cape Floristic Region, which is the most plant-diverse temperate region in the world. A few species are found in Australia and the Central Pacific area.

Carpobrotus is found as an introduced species on the western coast of the United States, New Zealand, the Mediterranean coast of Europe and the southern coast of Brazil.

== Evolution ==
The radiation of the Aizoaceae, specifically the subfamily Ruschioideae, was one of the most recent among the angiosperms, occurring 1.13–6.49 million years ago. It is also one of the fastest radiations ever described in the angiosperms, with a diversification rate of about 4.4 species per million years. This diversification was roughly contemporaneous with major radiations in two other succulent lineages, Cactaceae and Agave.

The family includes many species that use crassulacean acid metabolism as pathway for carbon fixation. Some species in the subfamily Sesuvioideae instead use C_{4} carbon fixation, which might have evolved multiple times in the group.

== Taxonomy ==
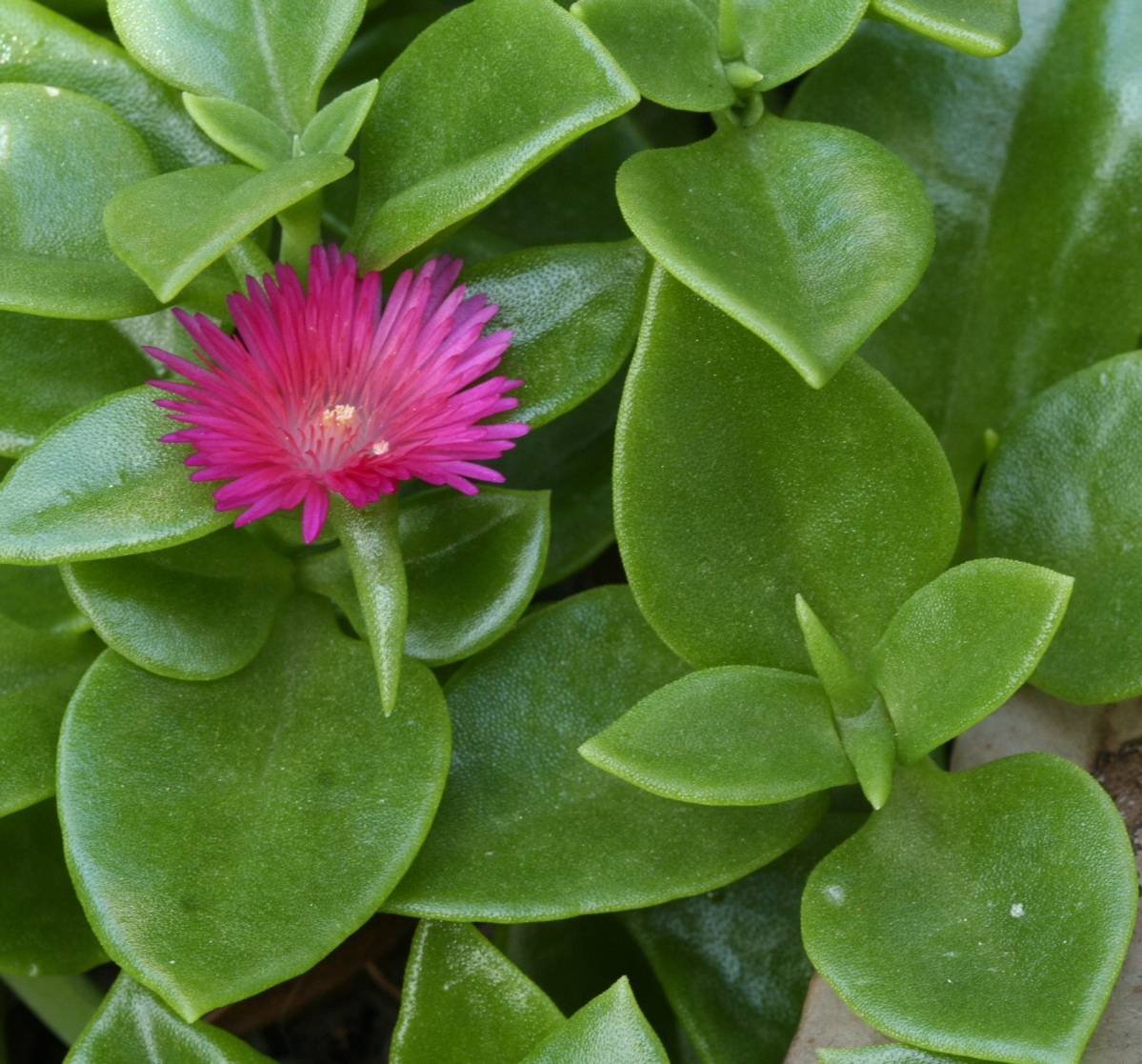
Mesembryanthemum cordifolium or rock rose

Because of the hyperdiversity of the Aizoaceae and the young age of the clade, many generic and species boundaries are uncertain.

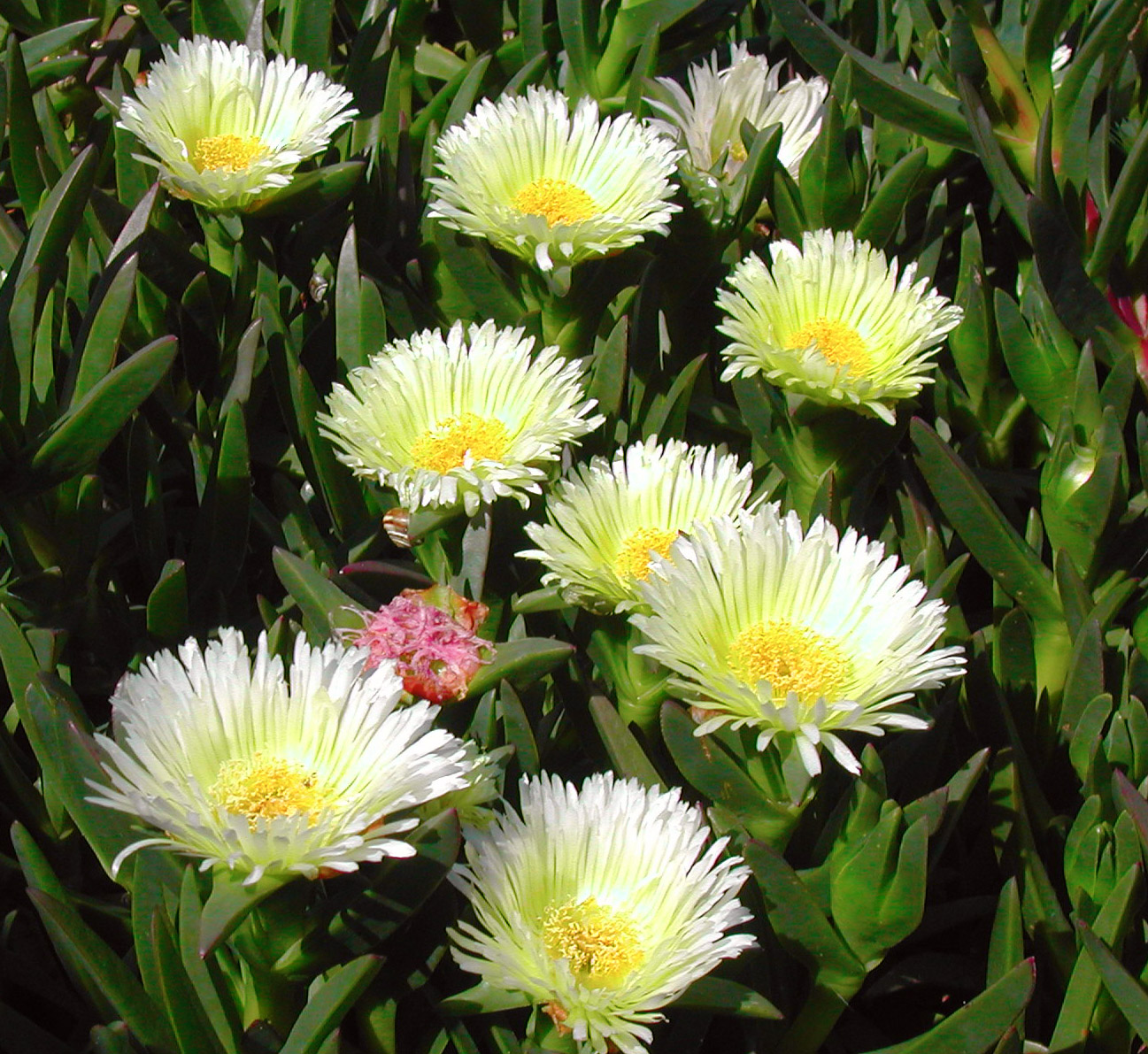
Carpobrotus edulis, an "ice plant"

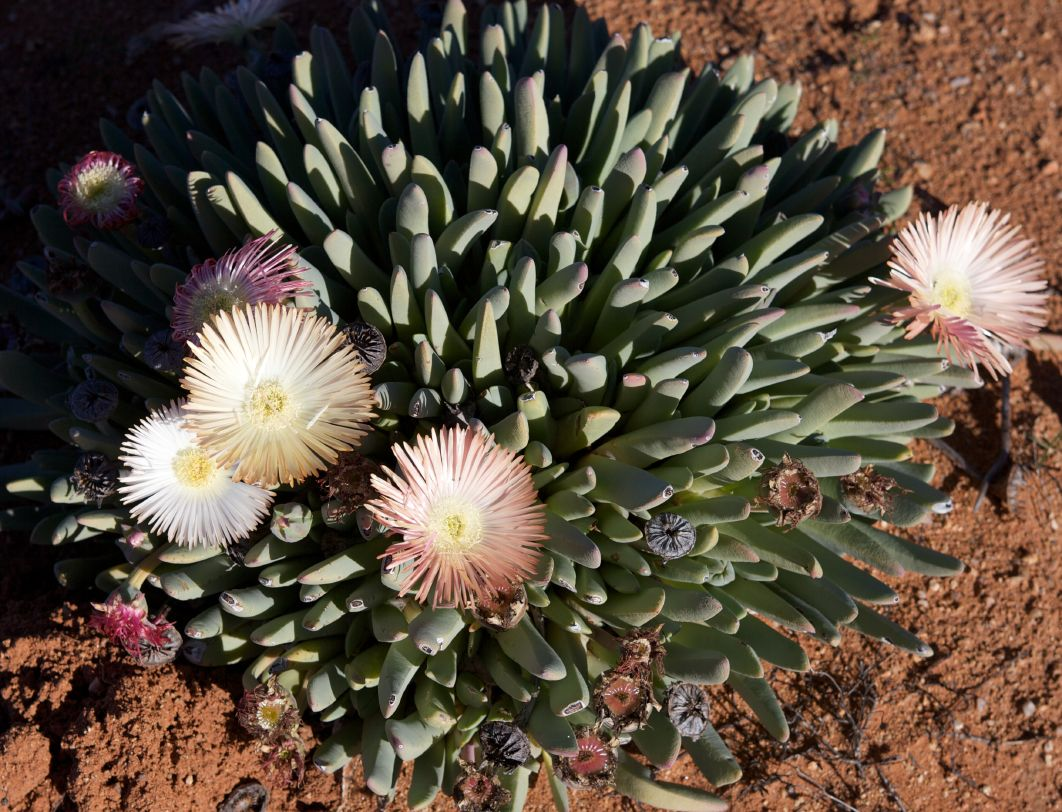
Cheiridopsis denticulata

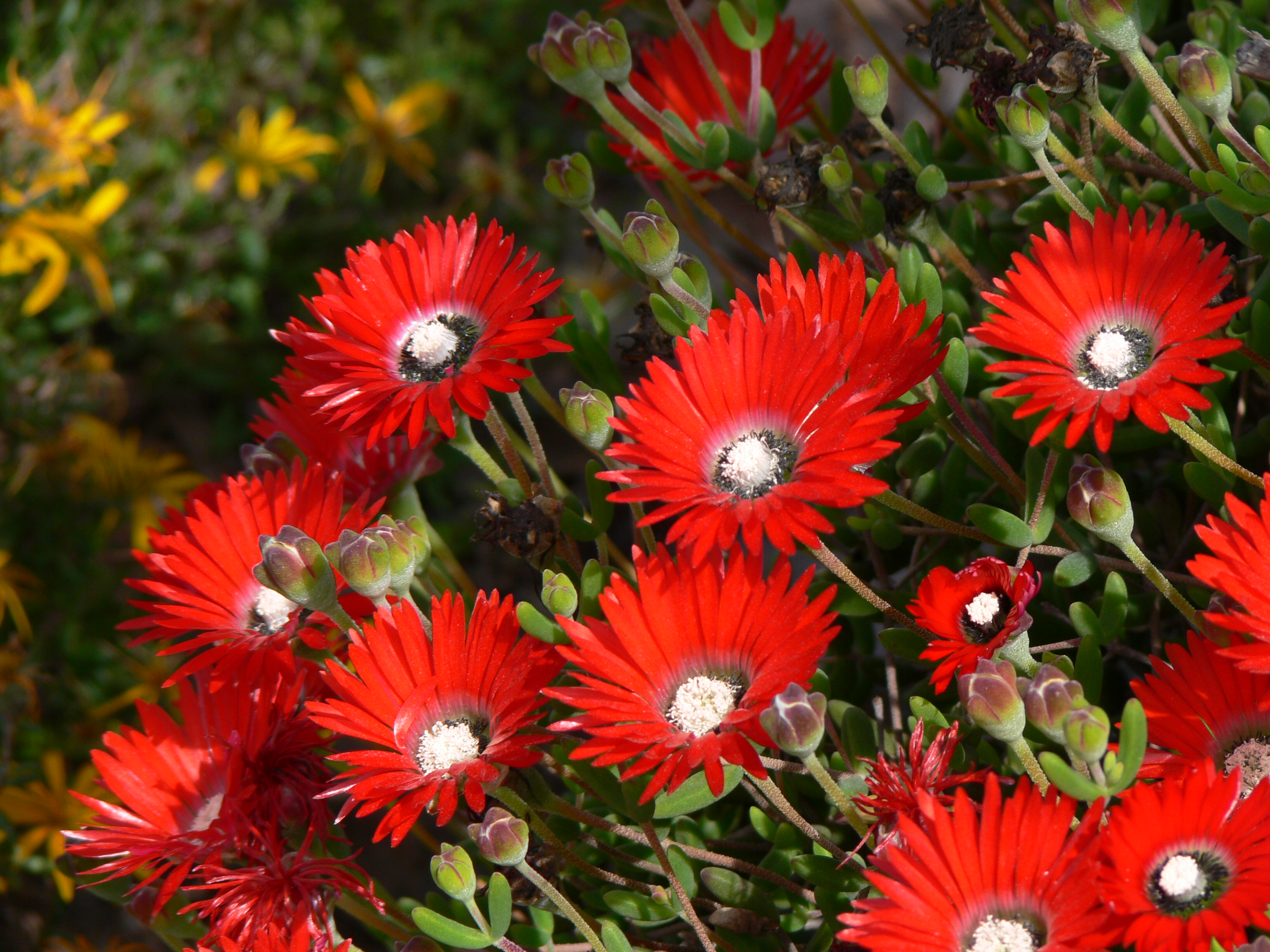
Drosanthemum speciosum

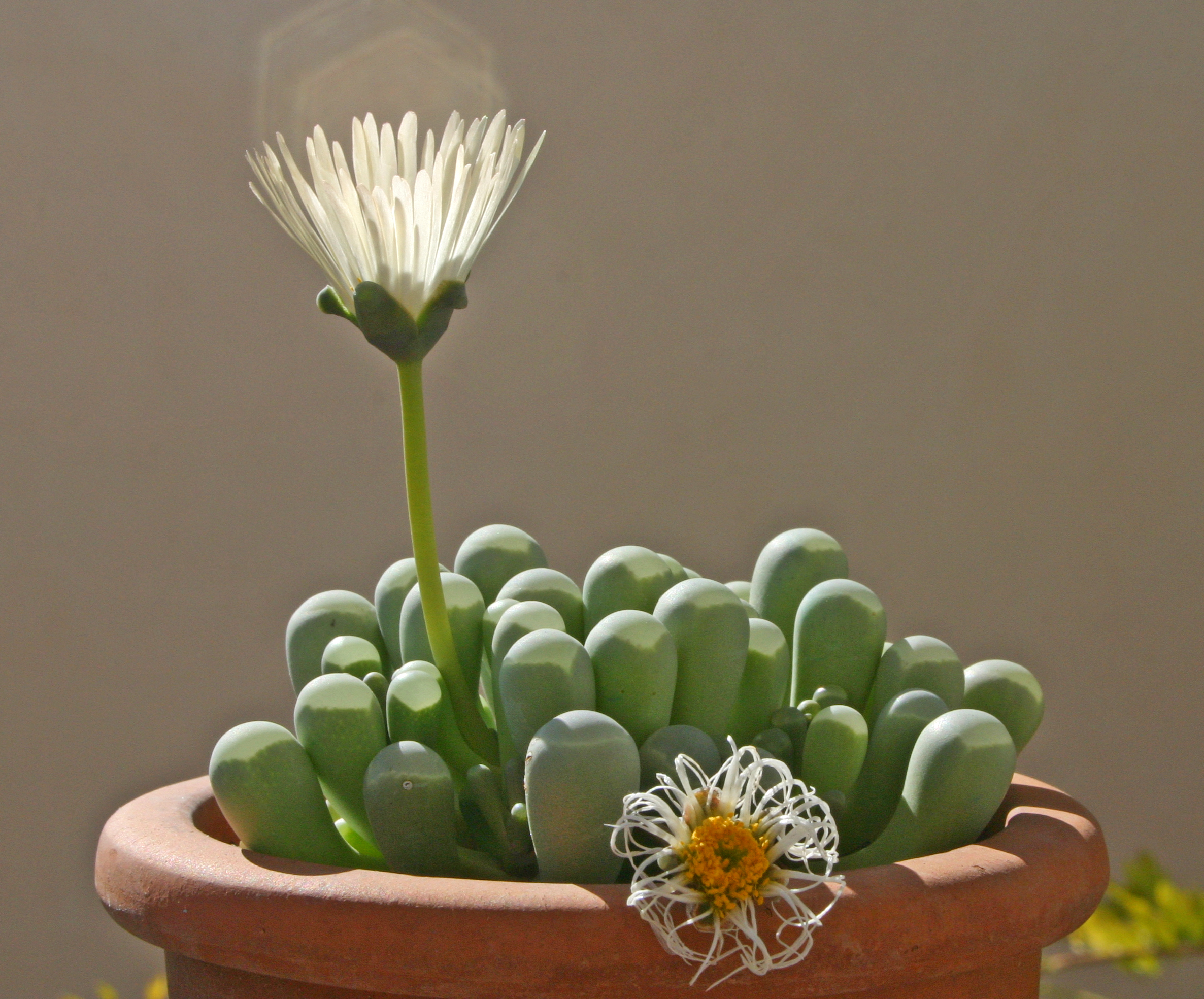
Fenestraria rhopalophylla

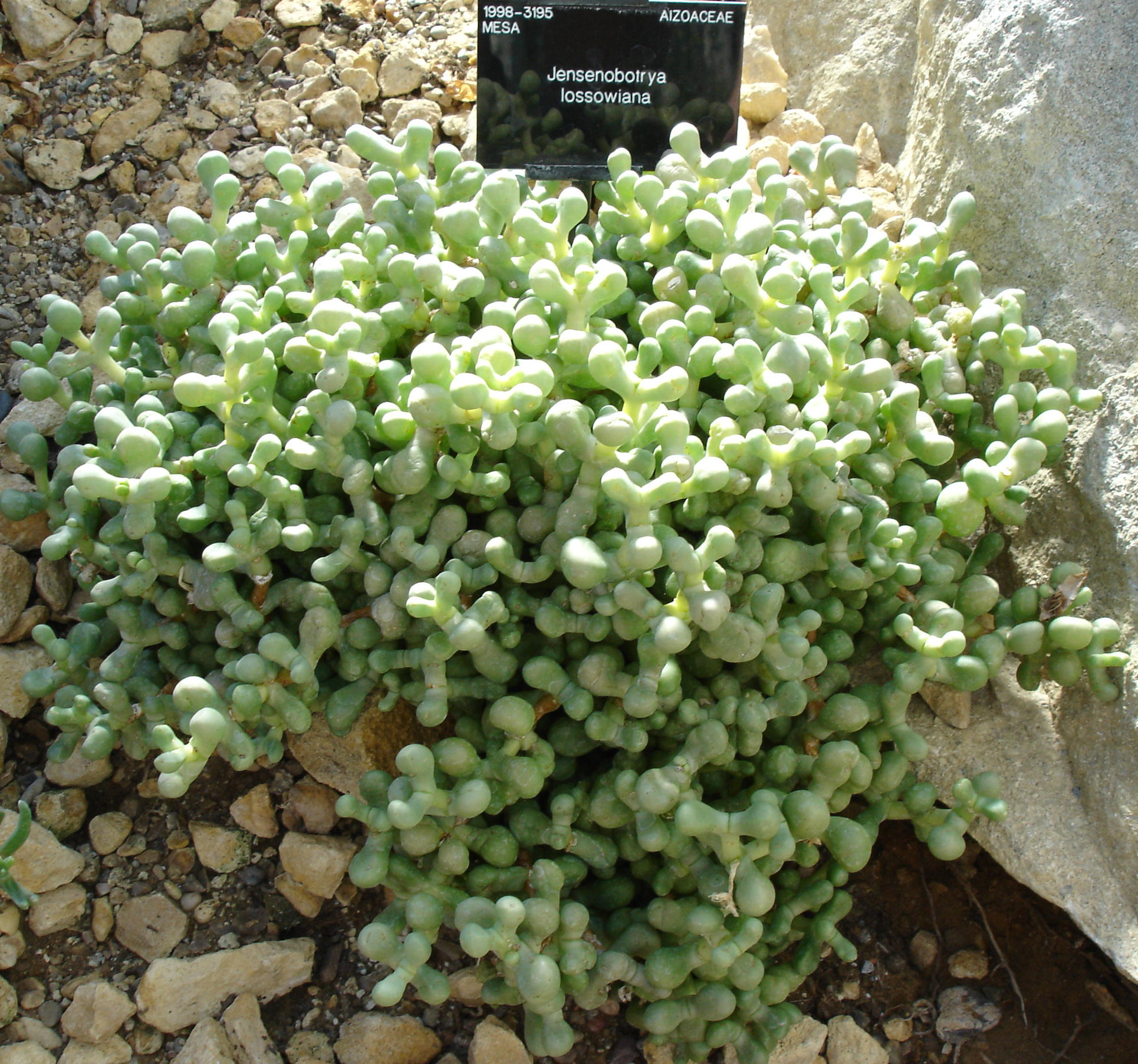
Jensenobotrya lossowiana

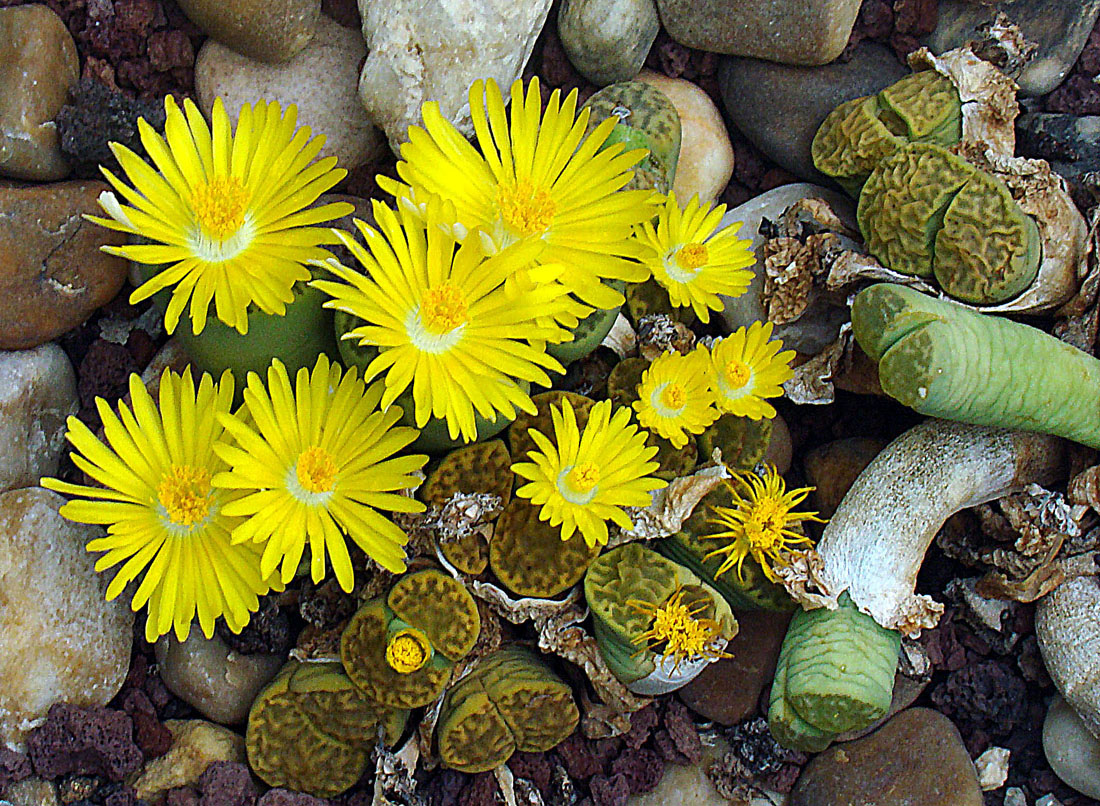
Lithops bromfieldii

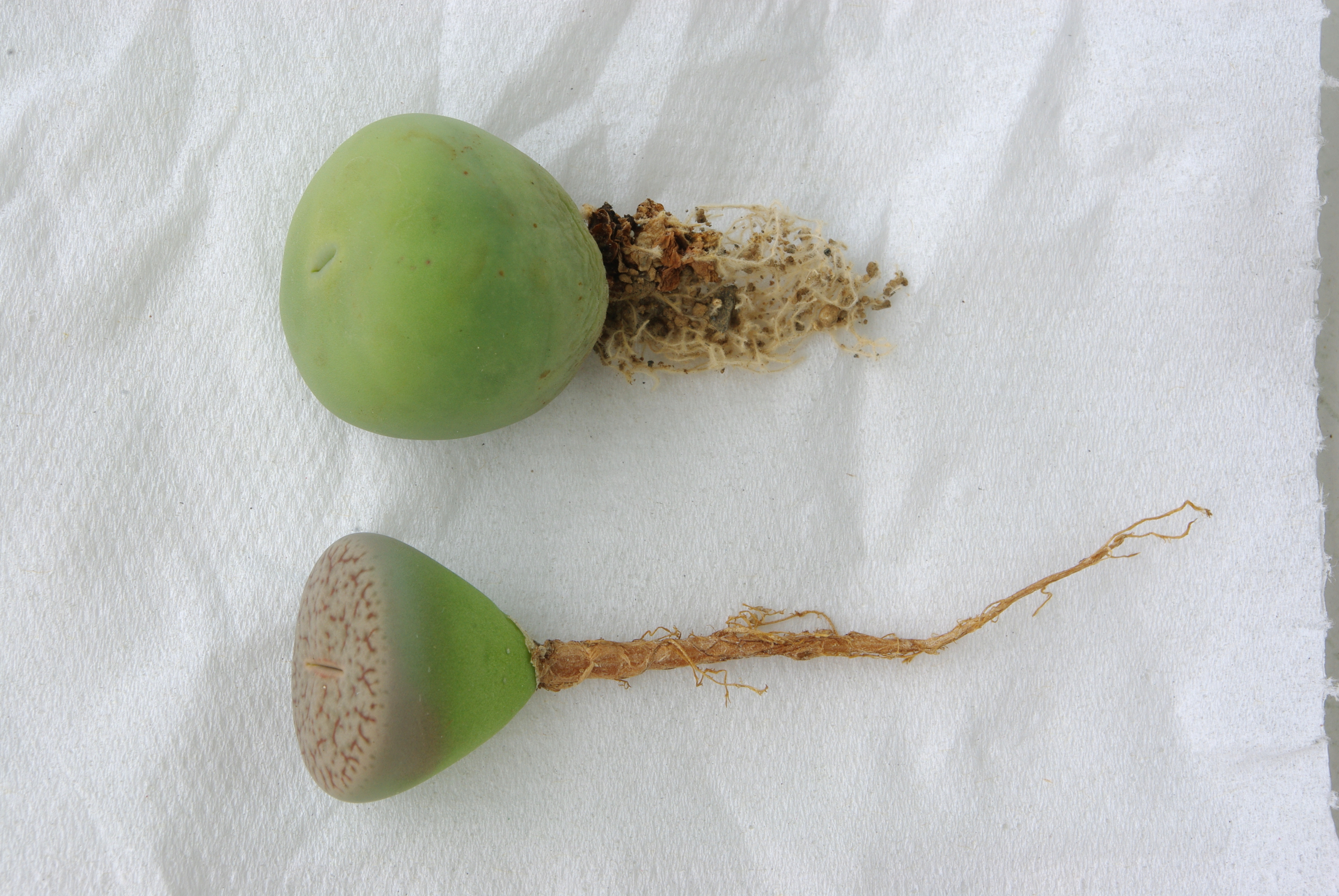
Conophytum pageae (top) and Lithops pseudotruncatella (bottom)

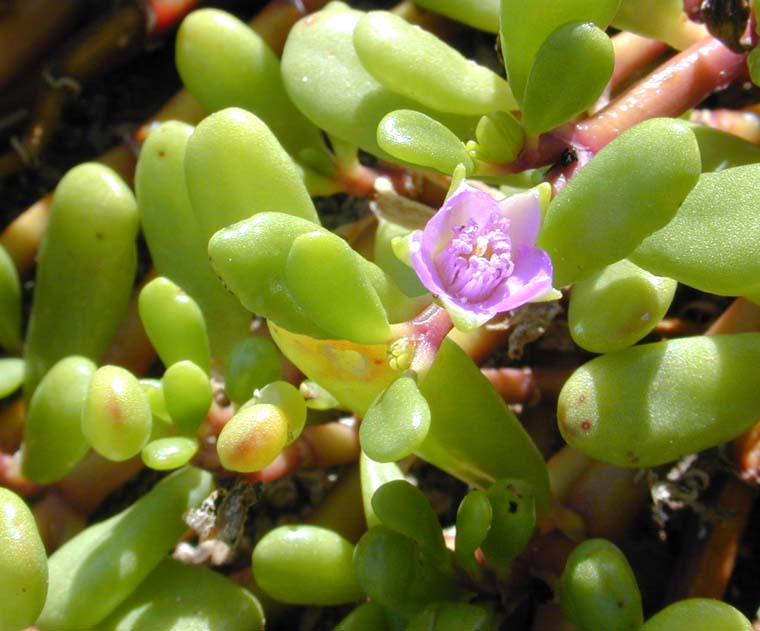
Sesuvium portulacastrum

=== Subfamily Acrosanthoideae ===
Genera:

- Acrosanthes Eckl. & Zeyh.

=== Subfamily Aizooideae ===
Genera:

- Aizoanthemopsis Klak
- Aizoanthemum Dinter ex Friedrich
- Aizoon L.
- Gunniopsis Pax
- Tetragonia L.

=== Subfamily Mesembryanthemoideae ===
Genera:

- Aptenia N.E.Br, synonym of Mesembryanthemum
- Aridaria N.E.Br, synonym of Mesembryanthemum
- Aspazoma N.E.Br, synonym of Mesembryanthemum
- Brownanthus Schwantes, synonym of Mesembryanthemum
- Dactylopsis N.E.Br, synonym of Mesembryanthemum
- Mesembryanthemum L.
- Phyllobolus N.E.Br, synonym of Mesembryanthemum
- Prenia N.E.Br, synonym of Mesembryanthemum
- Psilocaulon N.E.Br, synonym of Mesembryanthemum
- Synaptophyllum N.E.Br, synonym of Mesembryanthemum

=== Subfamily Ruschioideae ===
Genera:

Tribe Apatesieae

- Apatesia N.E.Br
- Carpanthea N.E.Br
- Caryotophora Leistner, synonym of Skiatophytum
- Conicosia N.E.Br
- Hymenogyne Haw.
- Saphesia N.E.Br
- Skiatophytum L.Bolus

Tribe Dorotheantheae

- Aethephyllum N.E.Br, synonym of Cleretum
- Cleretum N.E.Br
- Dorotheanthus Schwantes, synonym of Cleretum

Tribe Ruschieae

- Acrodon N.E.Br
- Aloinopsis Schwantes
- Amphibolia L.Bolus ex A.G.J.Herre
- Antegibbaeum Schwantes ex C.Weber
- Antimima N.E.Br
- Arenifera Herre, synonym of Mesembryanthemum
- Argyroderma N.E.Br
- Astridia Dinter
- Bergeranthus Schwantes
- Bijlia N.E.Br, synonym of Pleiospilos
- Braunsia Schwantes
- Brianhuntleya Chess. et al.
- Carpobrotus N.E.Br
- × Carruanthophyllum G.D.Rowley (Carruanthus × Machairophyllum)
- Carruanthus (Schwantes) Schwantes
- Cephalophyllum N.E.Br
- Cerochlamys N.E.Br
- Chasmatophyllum Dinter & Schwantes
- Cheiridopsis N.E.Br
- Circandra N.E.Br, synonym of Erepsia
- Conophytum N.E.Br
- Corpuscularia Schwantes, synonym of Delosperma
- Cylindrophyllum Schwantes
- Delosperma N.E.Br
- Dicrocaulon N.E.Br
- Didymaotus N.E.Br
- Dinteranthus Schwantes
- Diplosoma Schwantes
- Disphyma N.E.Br
- Dracophilus (Schwantes) Dinter & Schwantes
- Drosanthemum Schwantes
- Eberlanzia Schwantes
- Ebracteola Dinter & Schwantes
- Ectotropis N.E.Br, synonym of Delosperma
- Enarganthe N.E.Br
- Erepsia N.E.Br
- Esterhuysenia L.Bolus, synonym of Lampranthus
- Faucaria Schwantes
- Fenestraria N.E.Br
- Frithia N.E.Br
- Gibbaeum Haw. ex N.E.Br
- Glottiphyllum Haw. ex N.E.Br
- Hallianthus H.E.K.Hartmann
- Hereroa (Schwantes) Dinter & Schwantes
- Ihlenfeldtia H.E.K.Hartmann, synonym of Cheiridopsis
- Imitaria N.E.Br, synonym of Gibbaeum
- Jacobsenia L.Bolus & Schwantes
- Jensenobotrya A.G.J.Herre
- Jordaaniella H.E.K.Hartmann
- Juttadinteria Schwantes
- Khadia N.E.Br
- Lampranthus N.E.Br
- Lapidaria (Dinter & Schwantes) N.E.Br.
- Leipoldtia L.Bolus
- Lemonanthemum Klak
- Lithops N.E.Br
- Machairophyllum Schwantes
- Malephora N.E.Br
- Malephoropsis Klak
- Malotigena Niederle
- Marlothistella Schwantes
- Mestoklema N.E.Br. ex Glen
- Meyerophytum Schwantes
- Mitrophyllum Schwantes
- Monilaria (Schwantes) Schwantes
- Mossia N.E.Br
- Muiria N.E.Br
- Namaquanthus L.Bolus
- Namibia (Schwantes) Schwantes
- Nananthus N.E.Br
- Nelia Schwantes
- Neohenricia L.Bolus
- Octopoma N.E.Br
- Odontophorus N.E.Br, synonym of Cheiridopsis
- Oophytum N.E.Br
- Orthopterum L.Bolus
- Oscularia Schwantes
- Ottosonderia L.Bolus
- Phiambolia Klak
- Pleiospilos N.E.Br
- Polymita N.E.Br, synonym of Schlechteranthus
- Psammophora Dinter & Schwantes
- Rabiea N.E.Br
- Rhinephyllum N.E.Br
- Rhombophyllum (Schwantes) Schwantes
- Roosia van Jaarsv., synonym of Lampranthus
- Ruschia Schwantes
- Ruschianthemum Friedrich, synonym of Stoeberia
- Ruschianthus L.Bolus
- Sarcozona J.M.Black
- Schlechteranthus Schwantes
- Schwantesia Dinter
- Scopelogena L.Bolus
- Sederbergia Klak
- Smicrostigma N.E.Br
- Stayneria L.Bolus
- Stoeberia Dinter & Schwantes
- Stomatium Schwantes
- Tanquana H.E.K.Hartmann & Liede
- Titanopsis Schwantes
- Trichodiadema Schwantes
- Vanheerdea L.Bolus ex H.E.K.Hartmann
- Vanzijlia L.Bolus
- Vlokia S.A.Hammer
- Wooleya L.Bolus
- Zeuktophyllum N.E.Br

=== Subfamily Sesuvioideae ===
This subfamily includes a number of C_{4} species.

Genera:

Tribe Anisostigmateae

- Anisostigma Schinz
- Tribulocarpus S.Moore

Tribe Sesuvieae

- Sesuvium L.
- Trianthema L.
- Zaleya Burm.f.

=== Unplaced genera ===
Include;

- Hammeria Burgoyne
- Peersia L.Bolus

== Uses ==
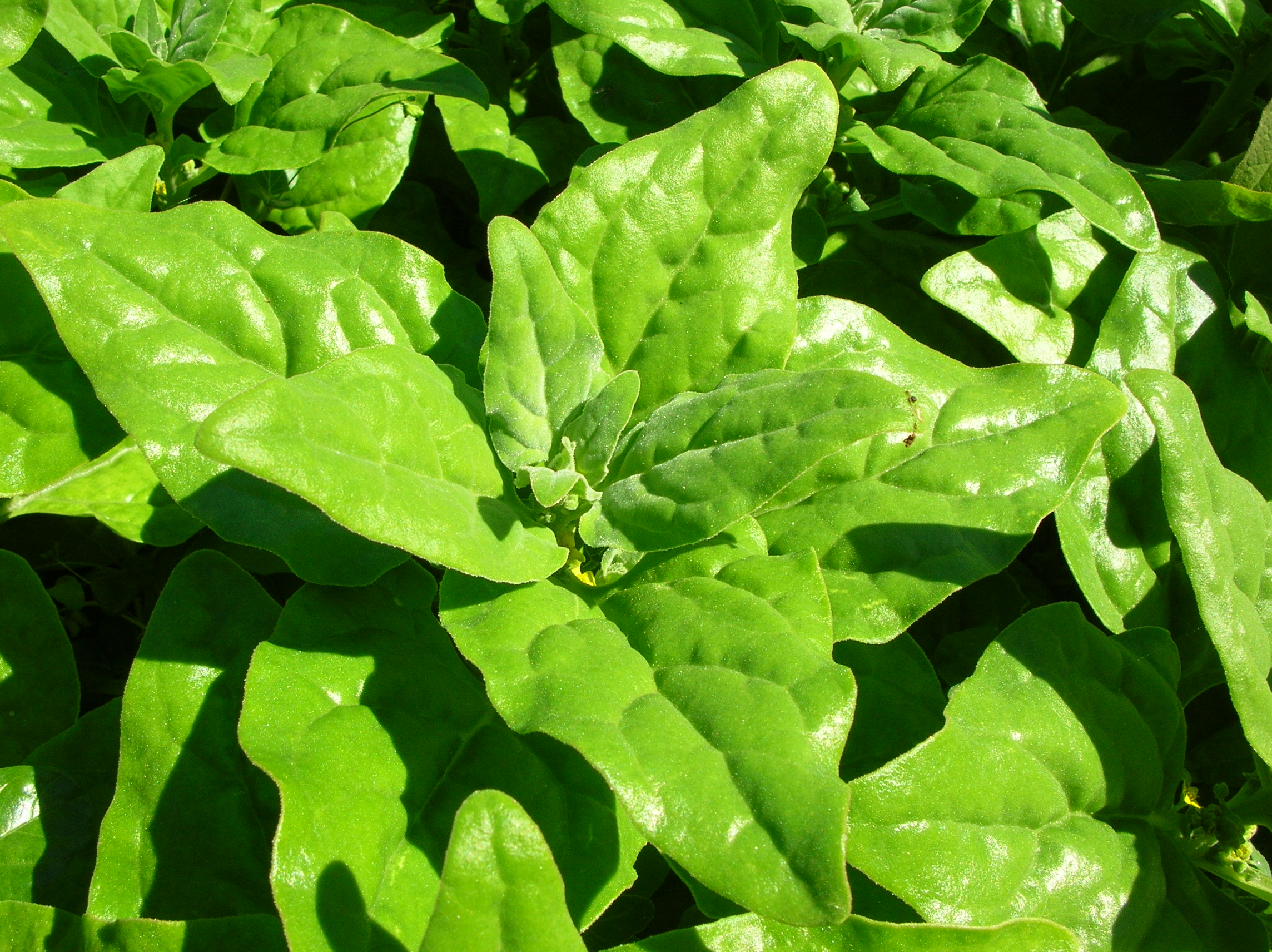
Tetragonia tetragonoides ("New Zealand spinach")

Several genera are cultivated. Lithops, or "living stones", are popular as novelty house plants because of their stone-like appearance.

Some species are edible, including:

- Carpobrotus edulis (Hottentot fig, highway ice plant) has edible leaves and fruit.
- Mesembryanthemum crystallinum has edible leaves.
- Tetragonia tetragonoides ("New Zealand spinach") is grown as a garden plant in somewhat dry climates and used as an alternative to spinach in upscale salads.

C. edulis was introduced to California in the early 1900s to stabilize soil along railroad tracks and has become invasive. In southern California, ice plants are sometimes used as firewalls; however, they do burn if not carefully maintained.
