= Succulent plant =

Plants adapted to arid conditions

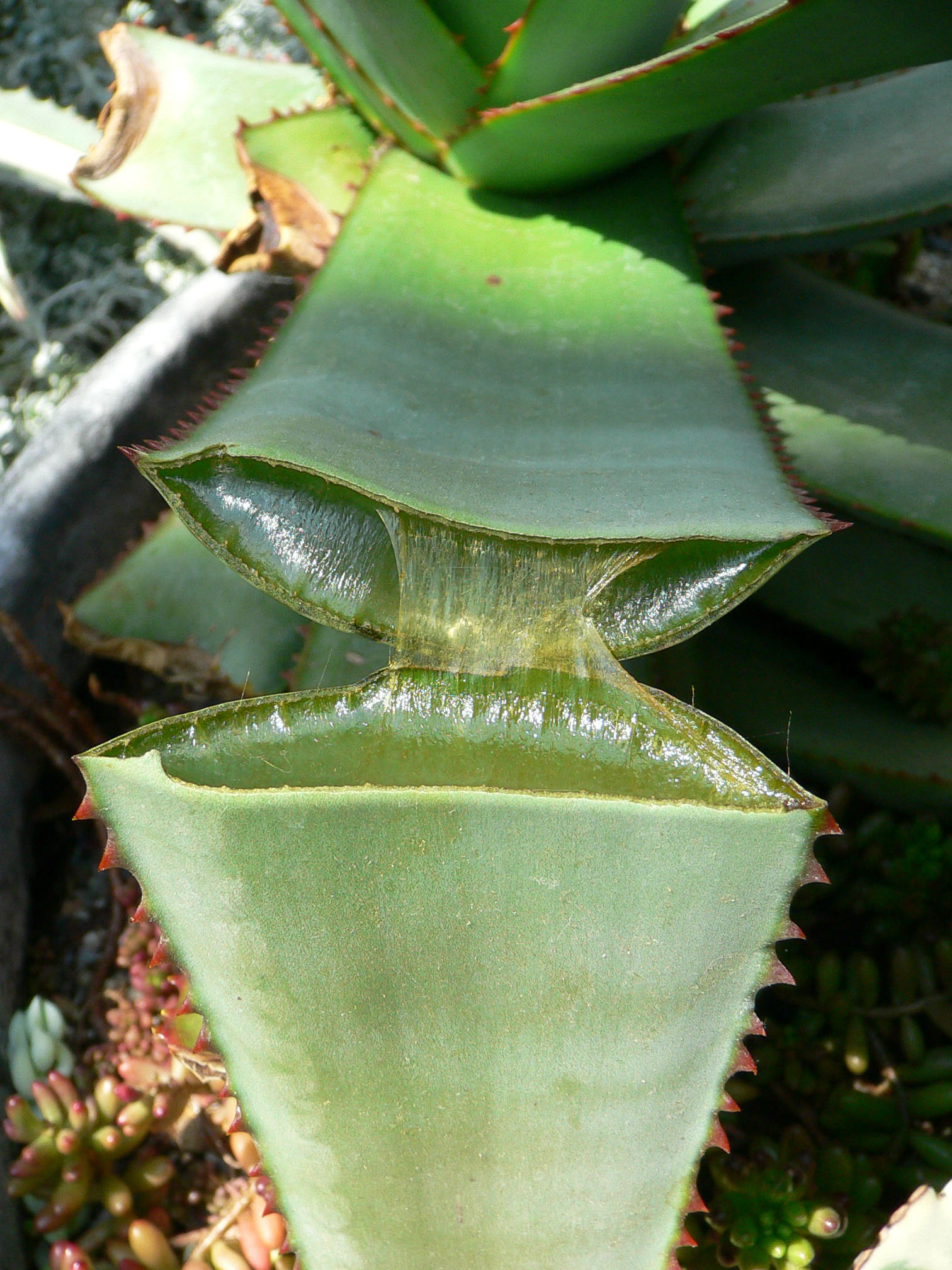
Succulent plants have thickened stems or leaves, such as this Aloe.

In botany, succulent plants, also known as succulents, are plants with parts that are thickened, fleshy, and engorged, usually to retain water in arid climates or soil conditions.

Succulents may store water in various structures, such as leaves and stems. The water content of some succulent organs can get up to 90–95%, such as Glottiphyllum semicyllindricum and Mesembryanthemum barkleyii. Some definitions also include roots, thus geophytes that survive unfavorable periods by dying back to underground storage organs (caudex) may be regarded as succulents. The habitats of these water-preserving plants are often in areas with high temperatures and low rainfall, such as deserts, but succulents may be found even in alpine ecosystems growing in rocky or sandy soil. Succulents are characterized by their ability to thrive on limited water sources, such as mist and dew, which makes them equipped to survive in ecosystems that contain scarce water sources.

Succulents are not a taxonomic category, since the term describes only the attributes of a particular species; some species in a genus such as Euphorbia, or family such as Asphodelaceae may be succulent, whereas others are less so or not at all. Multiple plant families contain both succulent and non-succulent species. In some families, such as Aizoaceae, Cactaceae, and Crassulaceae, most species are succulents. In horticultural use, the term is sometimes used in a way that excludes plants that botanists would regard as succulents, such as cacti. Succulents are often grown as ornamental plants because of their striking and unusual appearance, as well as their ability to thrive with relatively minimal care.

== Etymology ==
The term 'succulent' comes from the French succulent meaning 'full of juice', which ultimately itself derived from Latin succulentus 'having juice'. The word was used to refer to plants with thick tissues by 1825.

== Definition ==
By definition, succulent plants are drought-resistant plants in which the leaves, stem, or roots have become more than usually fleshy by the development of water-storing tissue. Other sources exclude roots as in the definition "a plant with thick, fleshy and swollen stems and/or leaves, adapted to dry environments". The difference affects the relationship between succulents and "geophytes"–plants that survive unfavorable seasons as a resting bud on an underground organ.

The underground organs, such as bulbs, corms, and tubers, are often fleshy with water-storing tissues. Thus, if roots are included in the definition, many geophytes would be classed as succulents. Plants adapted to living in dry environments such as succulents, are termed xerophytes. Not all xerophytes are succulents, since there are other ways of adapting to a shortage of water, e.g., by developing small leaves which may roll up or having leathery rather than succulent leaves. Nor are all succulents xerophytes, as plants such as Crassula helmsii are both succulent and aquatic.

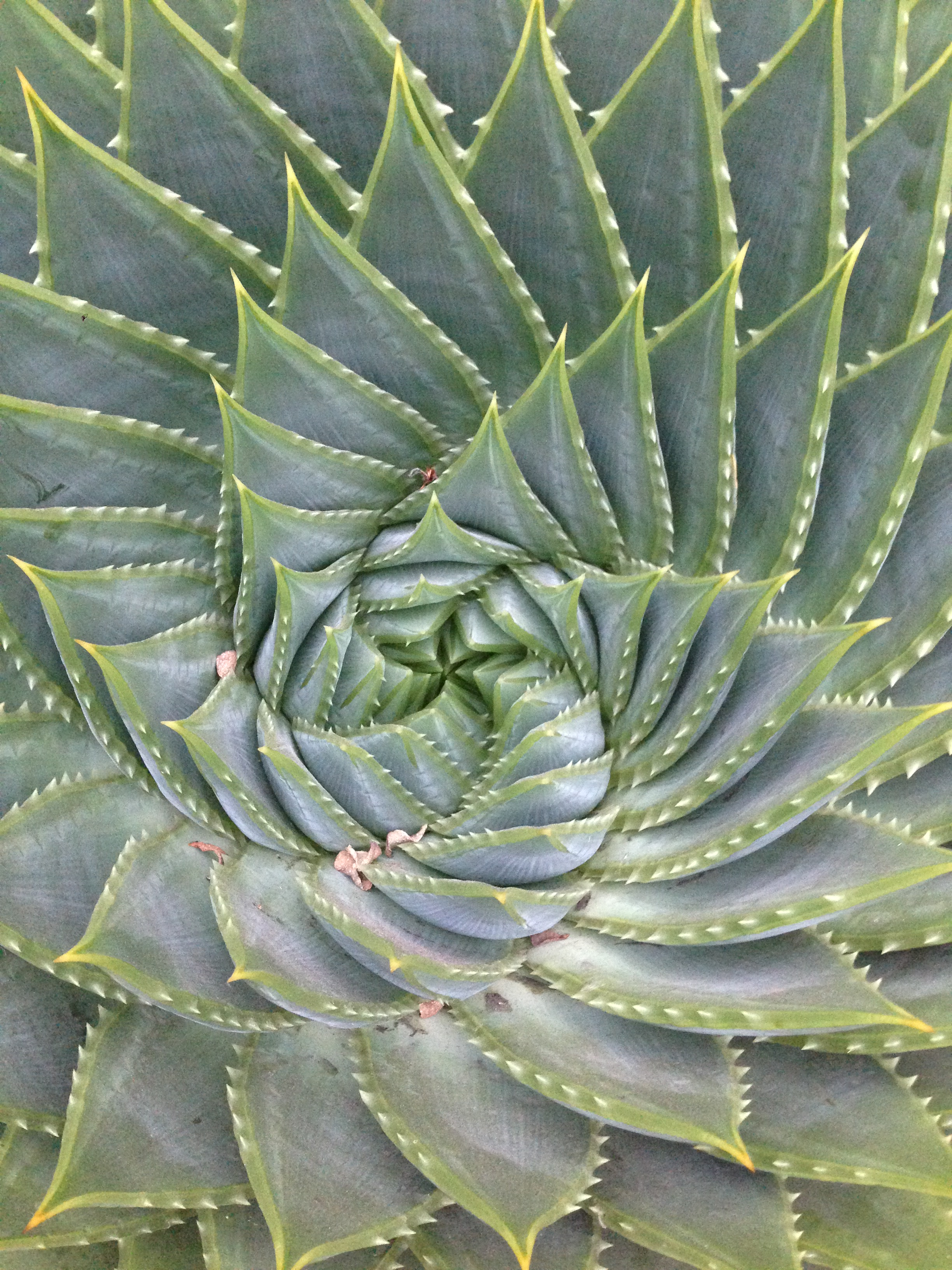
The center rosette of Aloe polyphylla

Some who grow succulents as a hobby may use the term in a different way from botanists. In horticultural use, the term succulent regularly excludes cacti. For example, Jacobsen's three volume Handbook of Succulent Plants does not include cacti. Many books covering the cultivation of these plants include "cacti (cactus) and succulents" as the title or part of the title. In botanical terminology, cacti are succulents, but not the reverse, as many succulent plants are not cacti. Cacti form a monophyletic group and apart from one species are native only to the New World, the Americas, but through parallel evolution similar looking plants in completely different families like the Apocynaceae evolved in the Old World.

A further difficulty for general identification is that plant families are neither succulent nor non-succulent and can contain both. In many genera and families, there is a continuous gradation from plants with thin leaves and normal stems to those with very clearly thickened and fleshy leaves or stems. The succulent characteristic becomes meaningless for dividing plants into genera and families. Different sources may classify the same species differently. Species with intermediate characteristics such as somewhat fleshy leaves or stems may be described as semi-succulent.

Horticulturists often follow commercial conventions and may exclude other groups of plants such as bromeliads, that scientifically are considered succulents. A practical horticultural definition has become "a succulent plant is any desert plant that a succulent plant collector wishes to grow", without any consideration of scientific classifications. Commercial presentations of "succulent" plants will present those that customers commonly identify as such. Plants offered commercially then as "succulents", such as hen and chicks, will less often include geophytes, in which the swollen storage organ is wholly underground, but will include plants with a caudex, that is a swollen above-ground organ at soil level, formed from a stem, a root, or both.

== Appearance ==
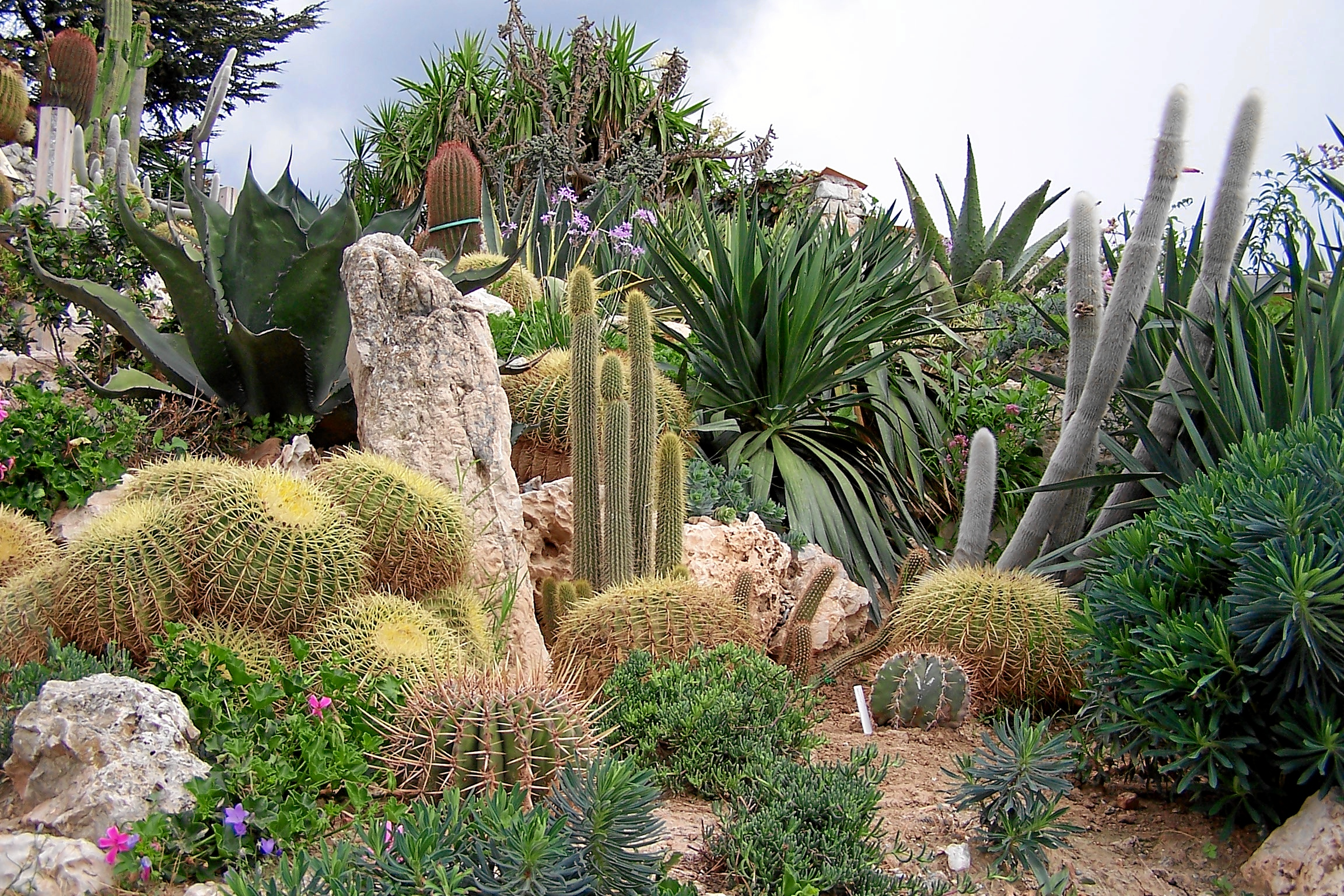
A collection of succulent plants, including cacti, from the Jardin botanique d'Èze, France

The storage of water often gives succulent plants a more swollen or fleshy appearance than other plants, a characteristic known as succulence. In addition to succulence, succulent plants variously have other water-saving features. These may include:

- crassulacean acid metabolism (CAM) to minimize water loss
- absent, reduced, or cylindrical-to-spherical leaves
- reduction in the number of stomata
- stems as the main site of photosynthesis, rather than leaves
- compact, reduced, cushion-like, columnar, or spherical growth form
- ribs enabling rapid increases in plant volume and decreasing surface area exposed to the sun
- waxy, hairy, or spiny outer surface to create a humid micro-habitat around the plant, which reduces air movement near the surface of the plant, and thereby reduces water loss and may create shade
- roots very near the surface of the soil, so they are able to take up moisture from very small showers or even from heavy dew
- ability to remain plump and full of water even with high internal temperatures (e.g., 52 °C or 126 °F)
- very impervious outer cuticle (skin)
- fast wound sealing and healing
- mucilaginous substances, which retain water abundantly

== Habitat ==
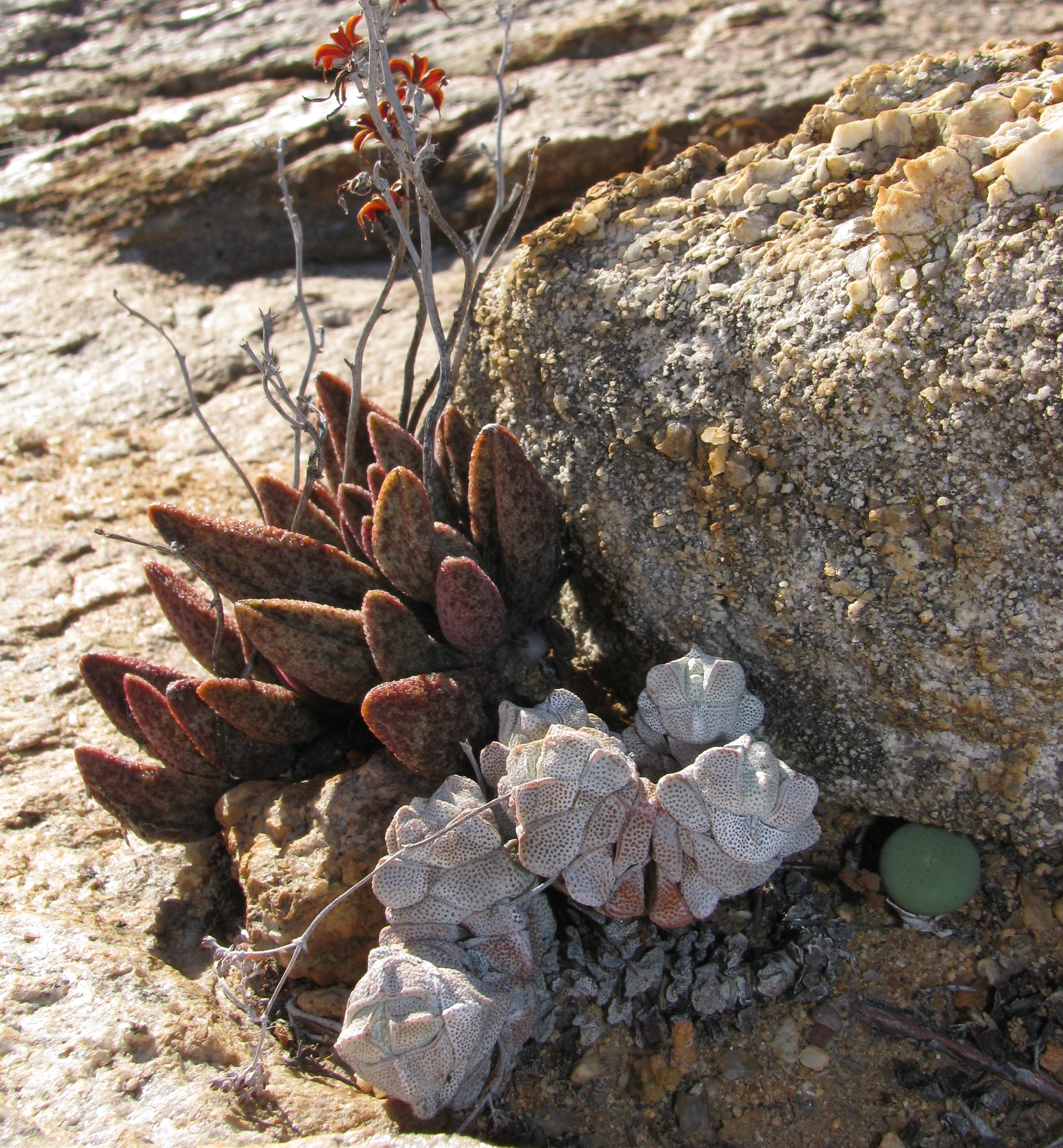
Succulents, such as these Adromischus marianae, Crassula deceptor and Conophytum, share an affinity for arid, fast-draining soils, often growing directly on rocks

Other than in Antarctica, succulents can be found within each continent. According to the World Wildlife Fund, South Africa is home to around a third of all succulent species, most residing in the succulent Karoo biome. While it is often thought that most succulents come from dry areas such as steppes, semi-desert, and desert, the world's driest areas do not make for proper succulent habitats, mainly due to the difficulty such low growing plants or seedlings would have to thrive in environments where they could easily be covered by sand.

Australia, the world's driest inhabited continent, hosts very few native succulents due to the frequent and prolonged droughts. Even Africa, the continent with the most native succulents, does not host many of the plants in its most dry regions. While succulents are unable to grow in these harshest of conditions, they are able to grow in conditions that are uninhabitable by other plants. In fact, many succulents are able to thrive in dry conditions, and some are able to last up to two years without water depending on their surroundings and adaptations.

Occasionally, succulents may occur as epiphytes, growing on other plants with limited or no contact with the ground, and being dependent on their ability to store water and gaining nutrients by other means; it is seen in Tillandsia and Rhipsalis. Succulents also occur as inhabitants of sea coasts and dry lakes, which are exposed to high levels of dissolved minerals that are deadly to many other plant species. California is home to over one hundred succulent species that are native to the state; many of them live in coastal environments. Potted succulents are able to grow in most indoor environments with minimal care.

== Conservation ==
There is a thriving illegal trade in cacti and succulents. In South Africa, several species of succulent have been threatened with extinction due to poaching from the wild for the black market and mining related activities. The plants are mainly sold to collectors in Asian countries, where there has been a high demand for them. Since 1974, it is illegal to be in possession of protected succulents such as the Conophytum without authorisation in the Western Cape and Northern Cape, the two South African provinces where they grow.

== Families and genera ==
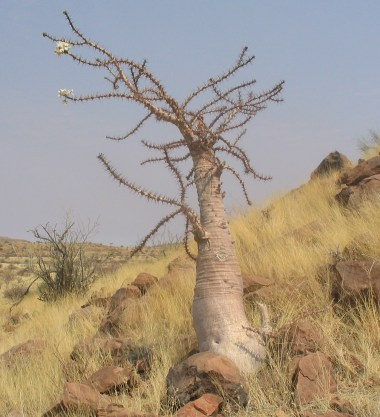
Apocynaceae: Pachypodium lealii, stem succulent

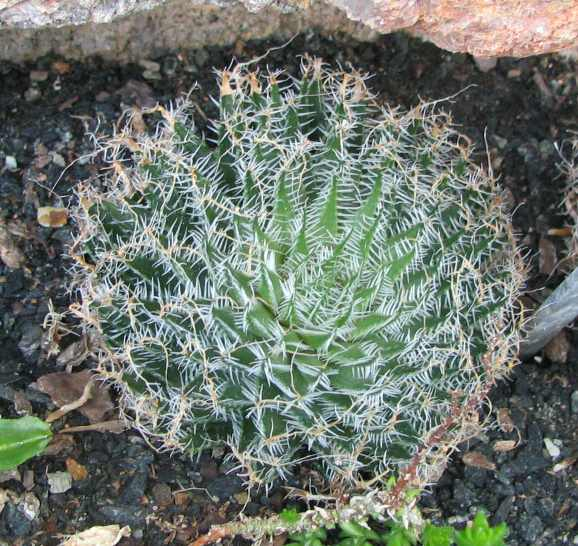
Asphodelaceae: Haworthia arachnoidea, leaf succulent

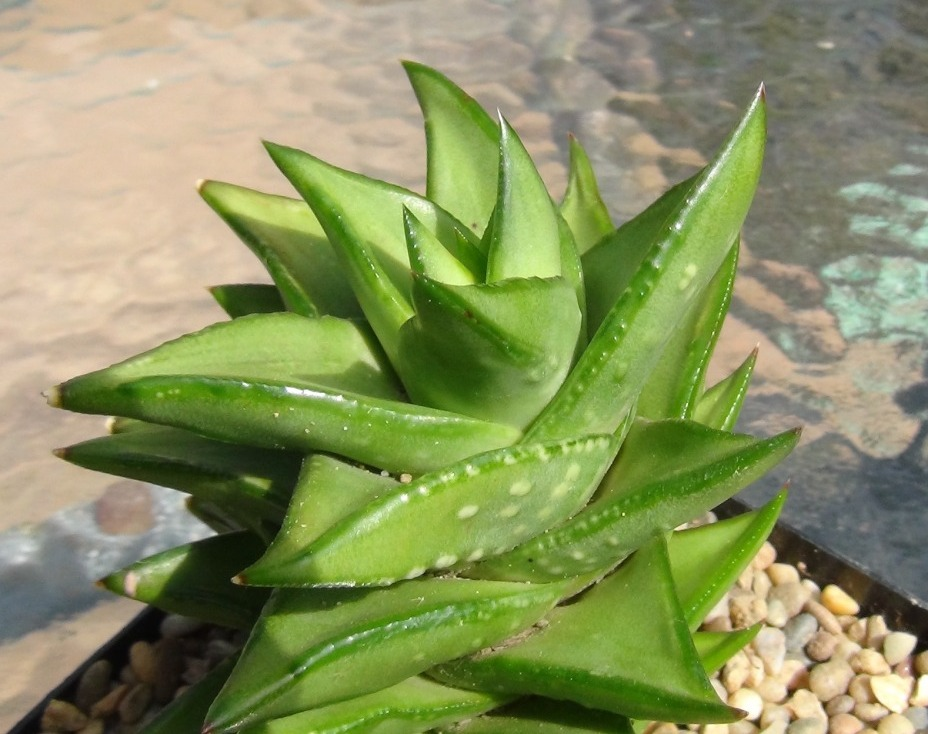
Asphodelaceae: Astroloba tenax, leaf succulent

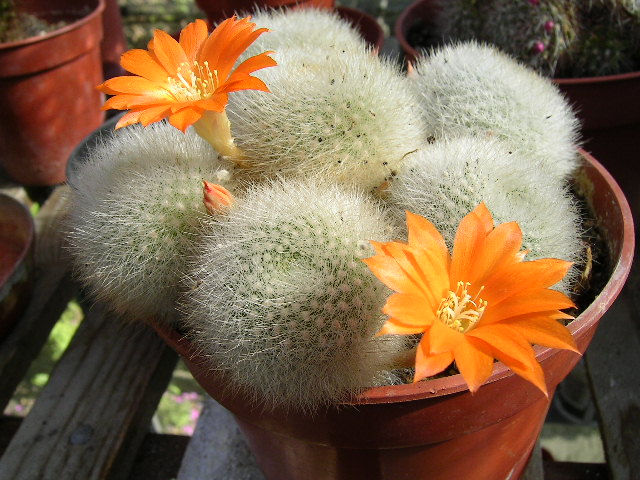
Cactaceae: Rebutia muscula, stem succulent

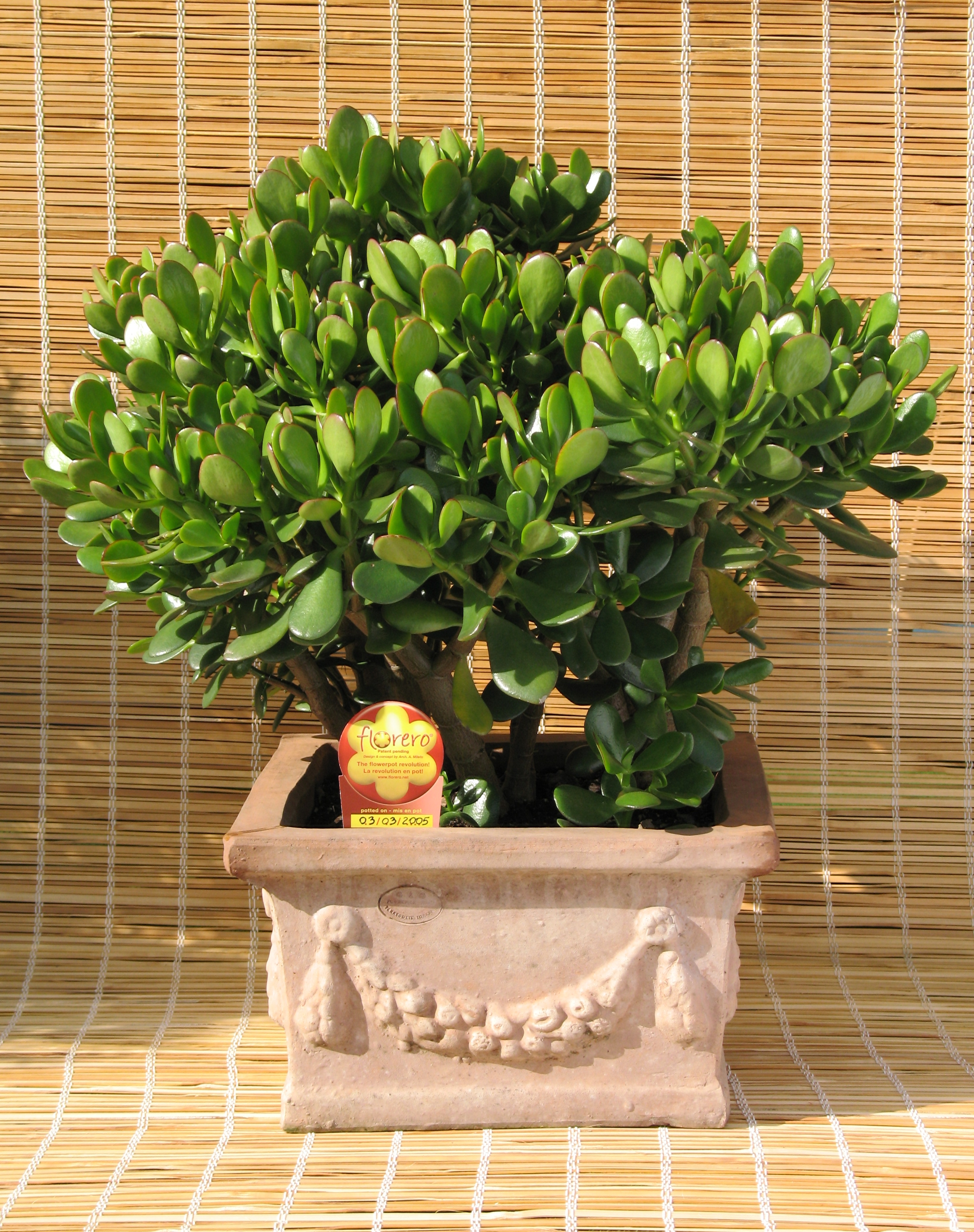
Crassulaceae: Crassula ovata, stem and leaf succulent

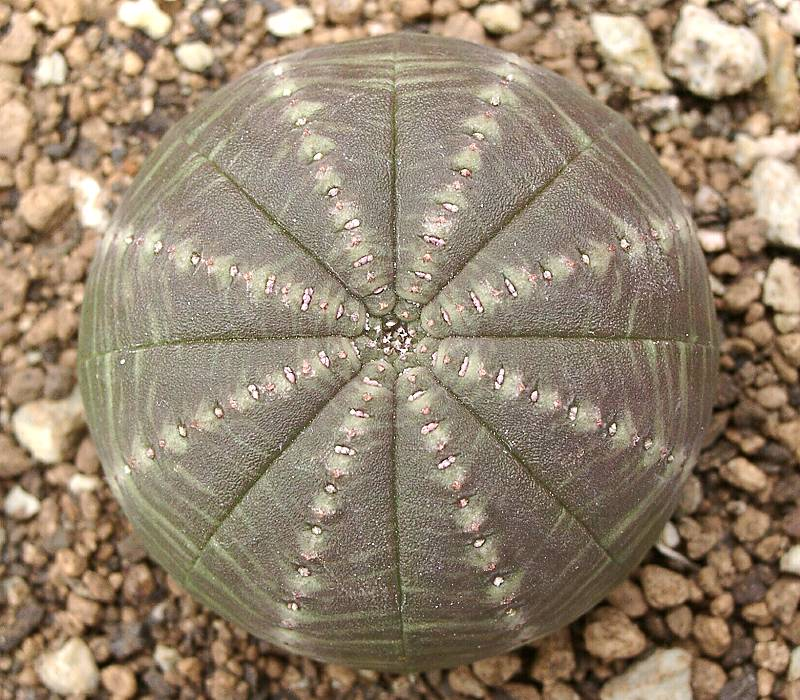
Euphorbiaceae: Euphorbia obesa ssp. symmetrica, stem succulent

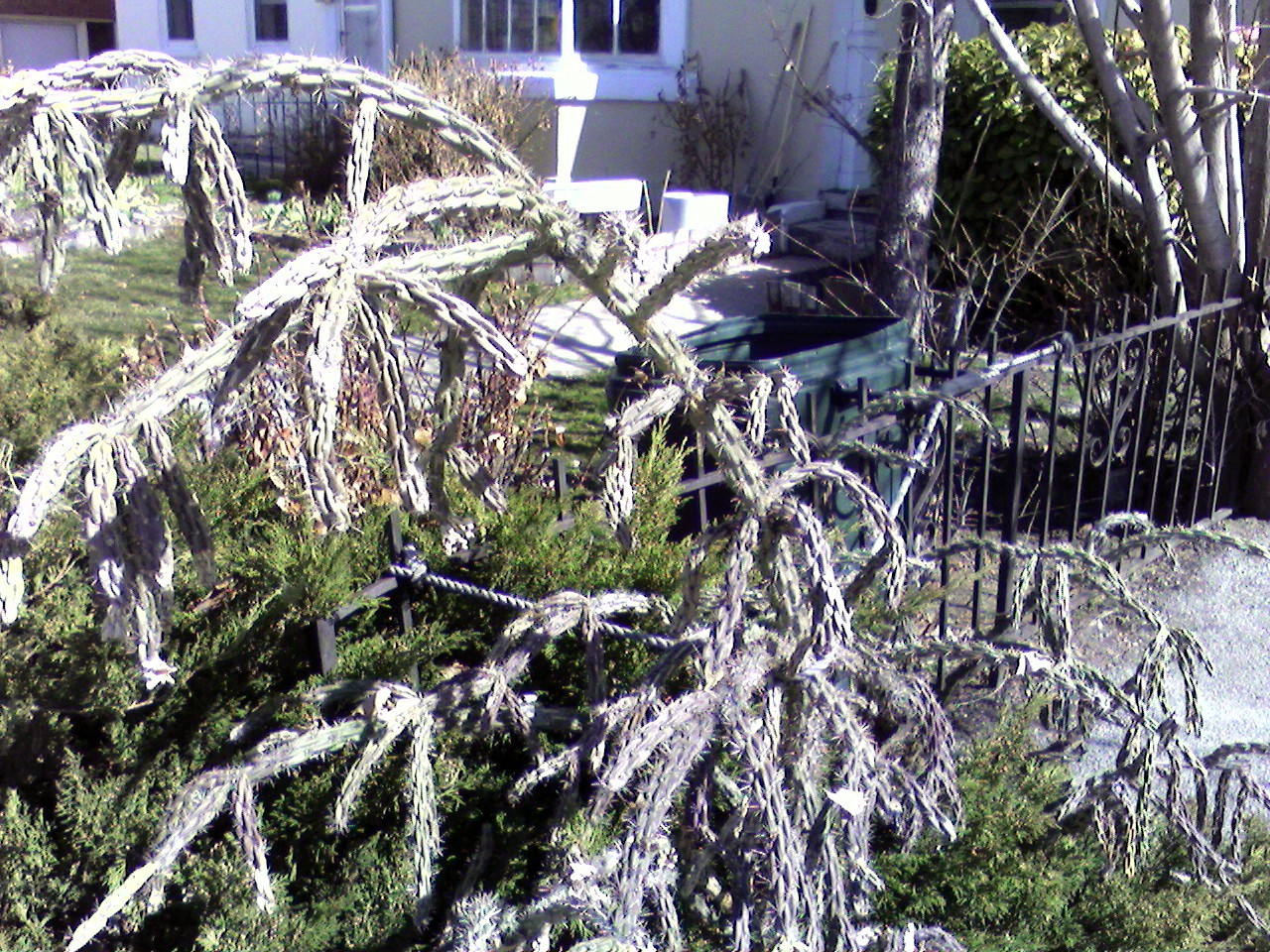
Cylindropuntia imbricata: stem, woody succulent

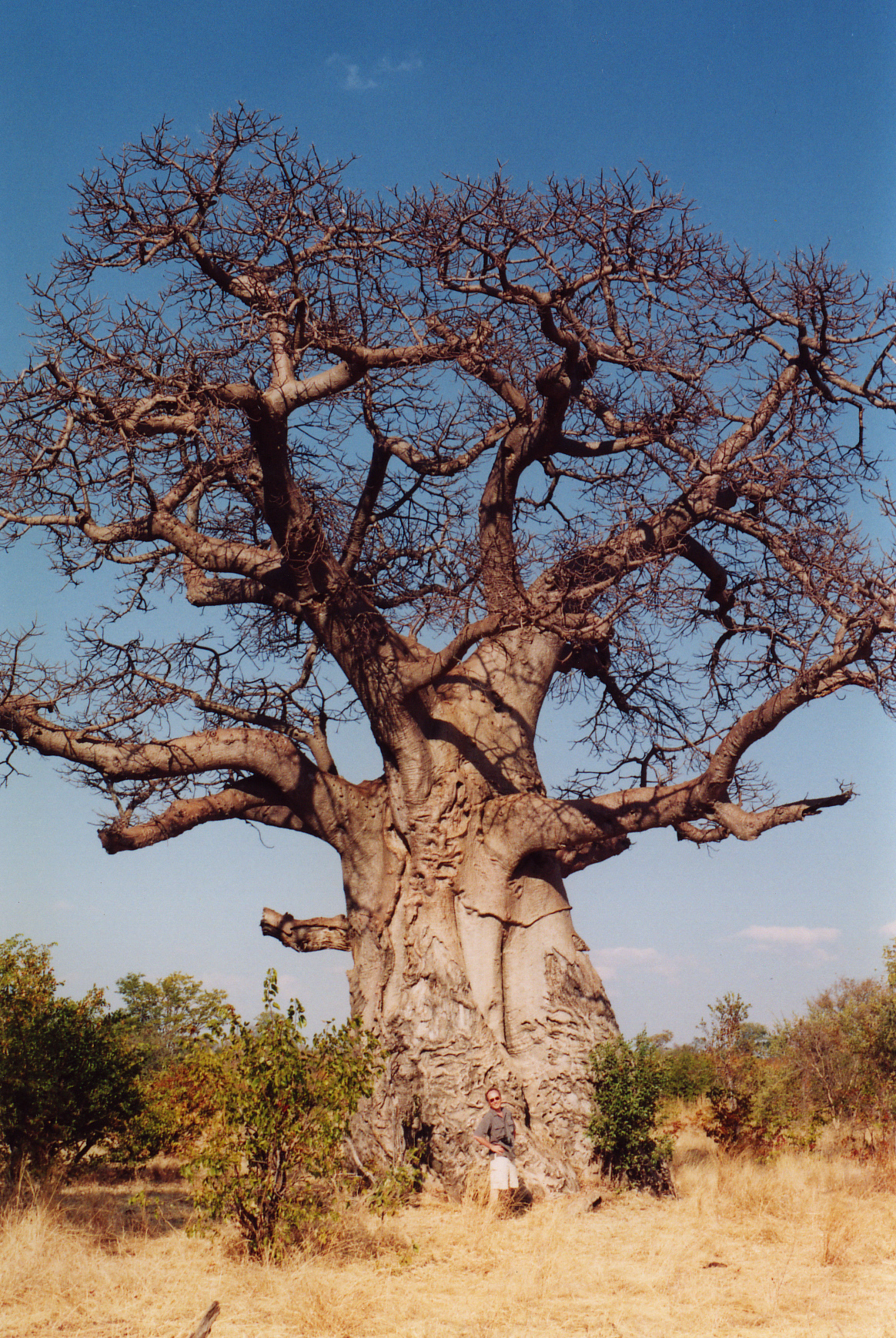
Malvaceae: Adansonia digitata, stem succulent

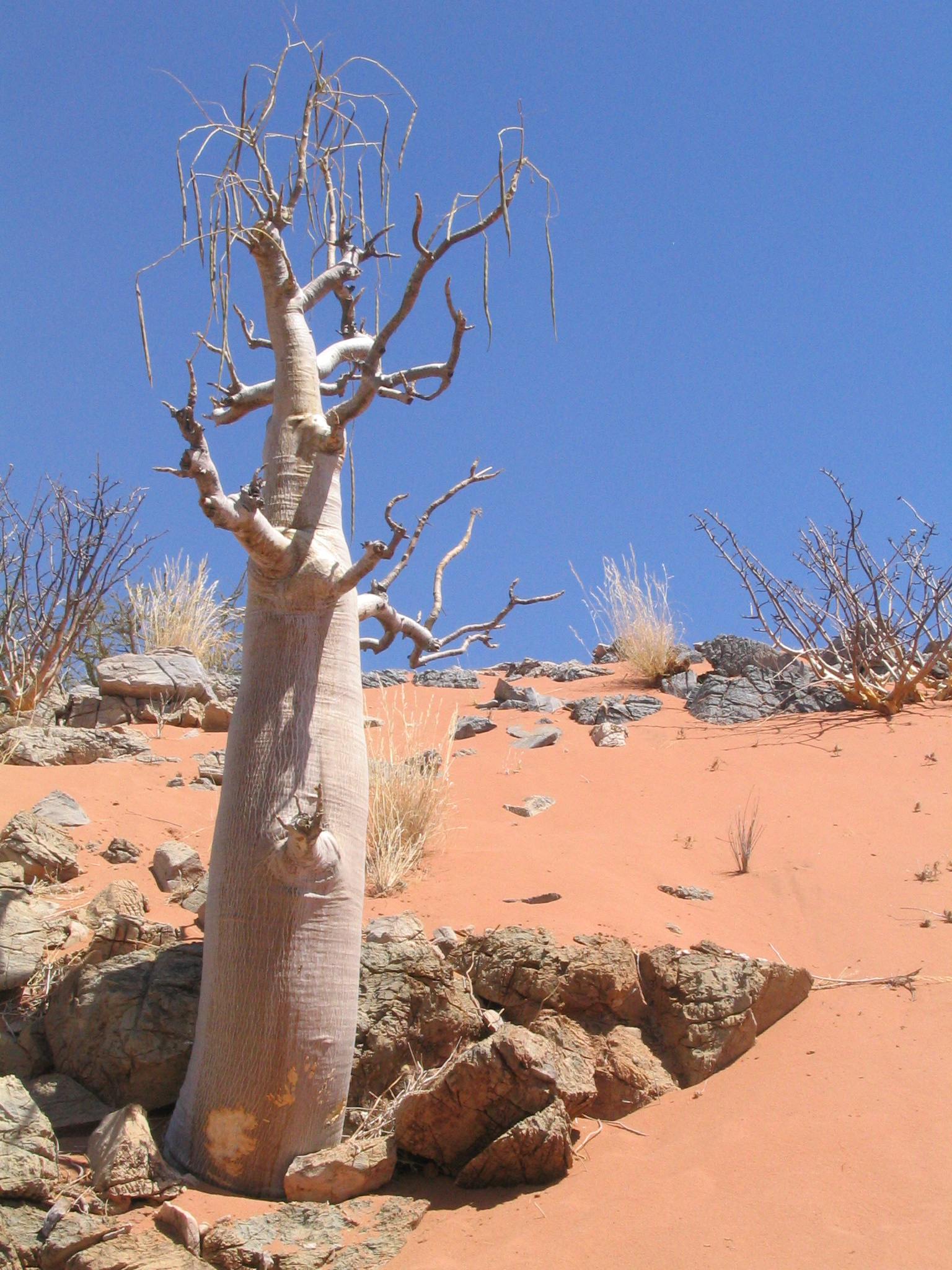
Moringaceae: Moringa ovalifolia, stem succulent

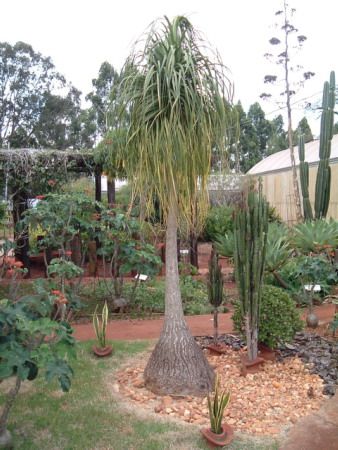
Asparagaceae: Beaucarnea recurvata, stem succulent

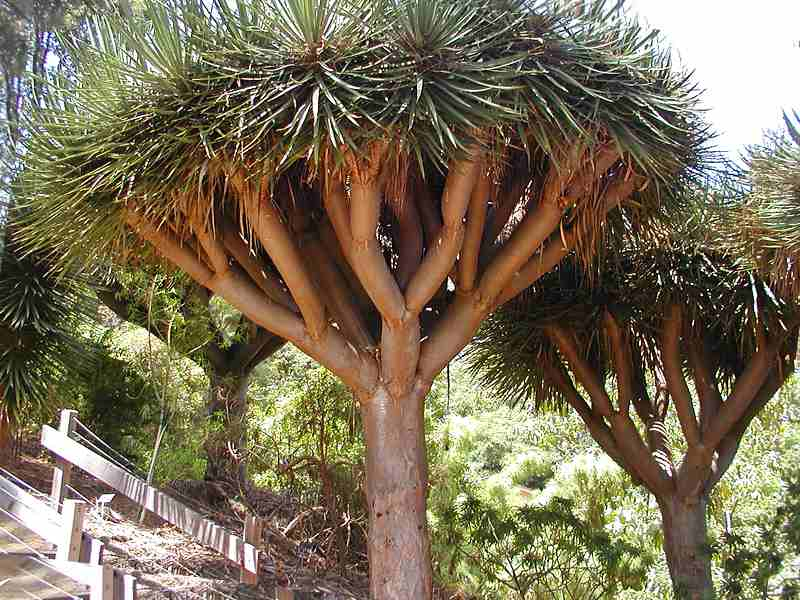
Asparagaceae: Dracaena draco, stem succulent

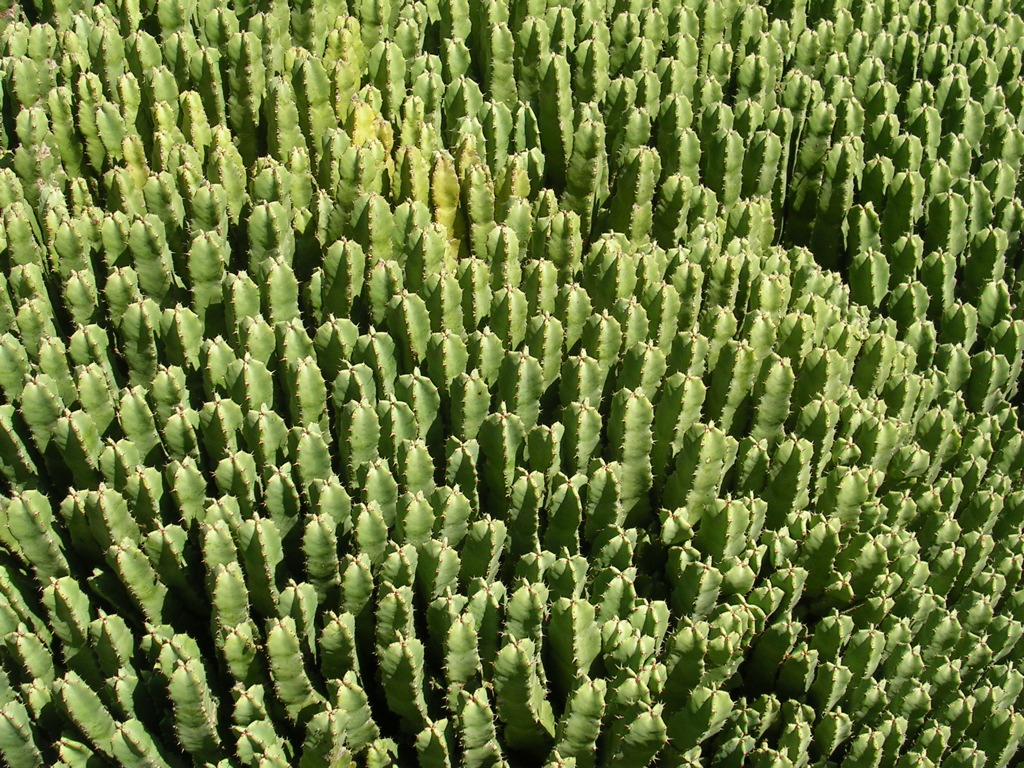
Euphorbia resinifera

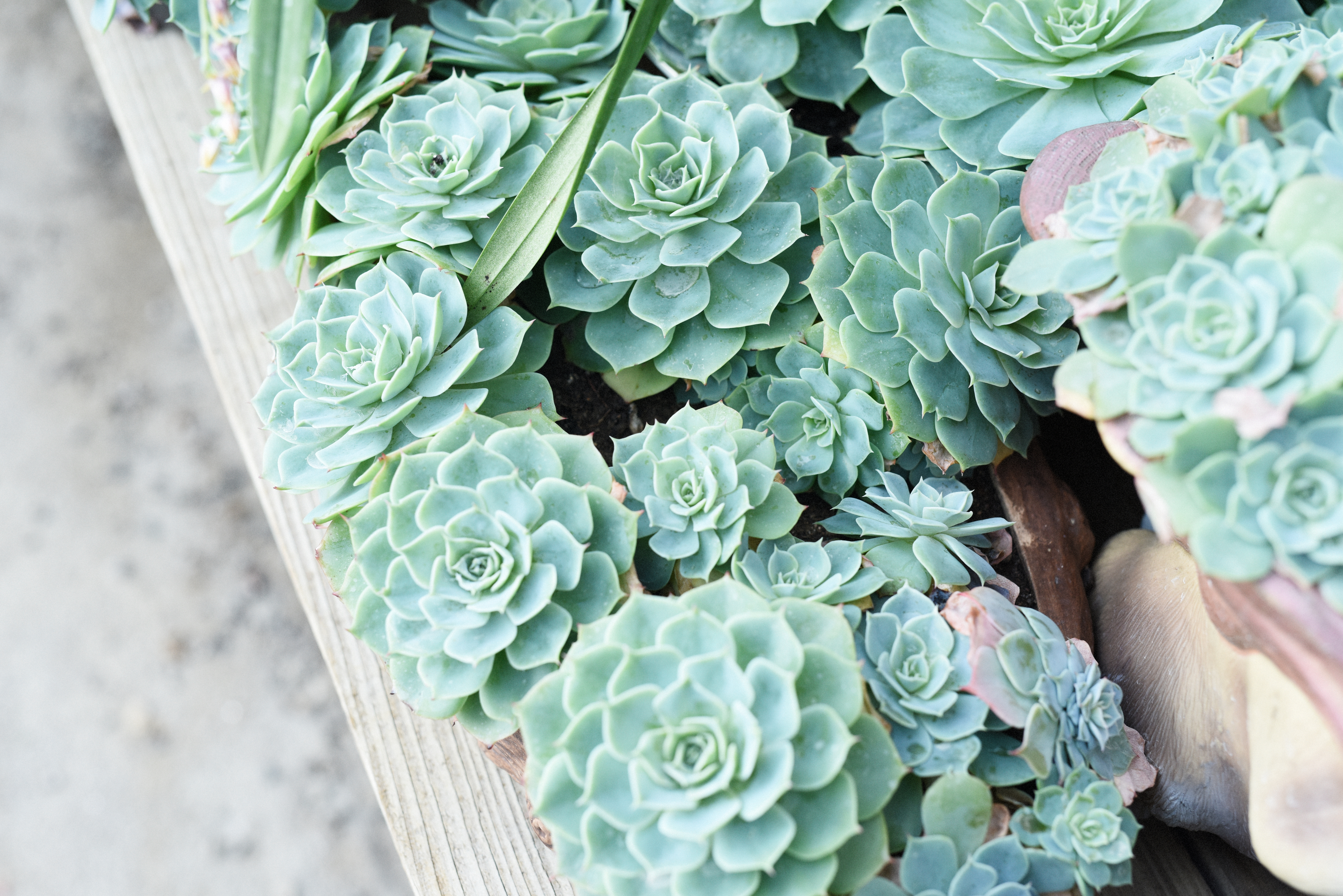
Succulents kept at 25 °C (77 °F) in a Connecticut greenhouse

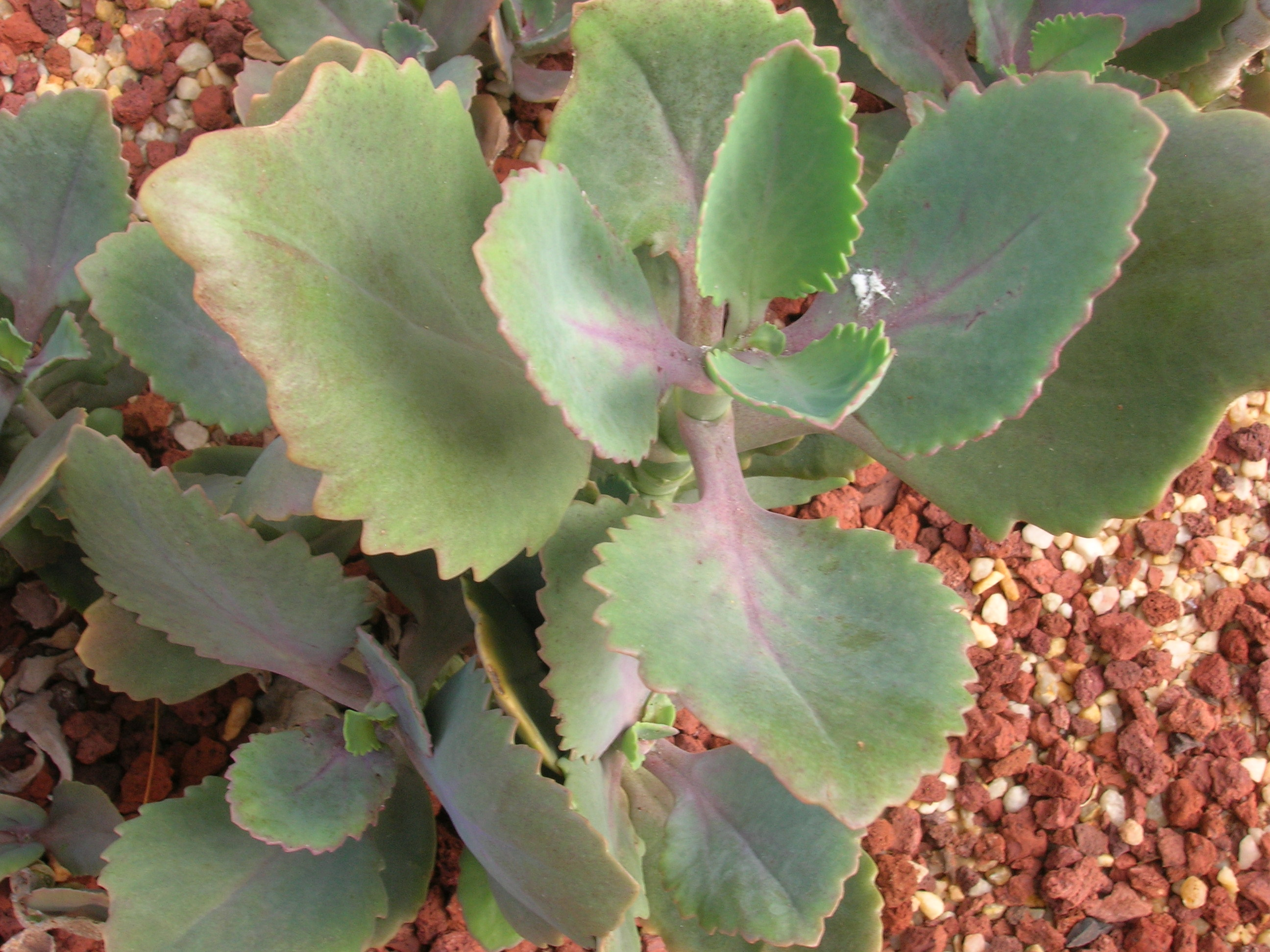
Kalanchoe longiflora

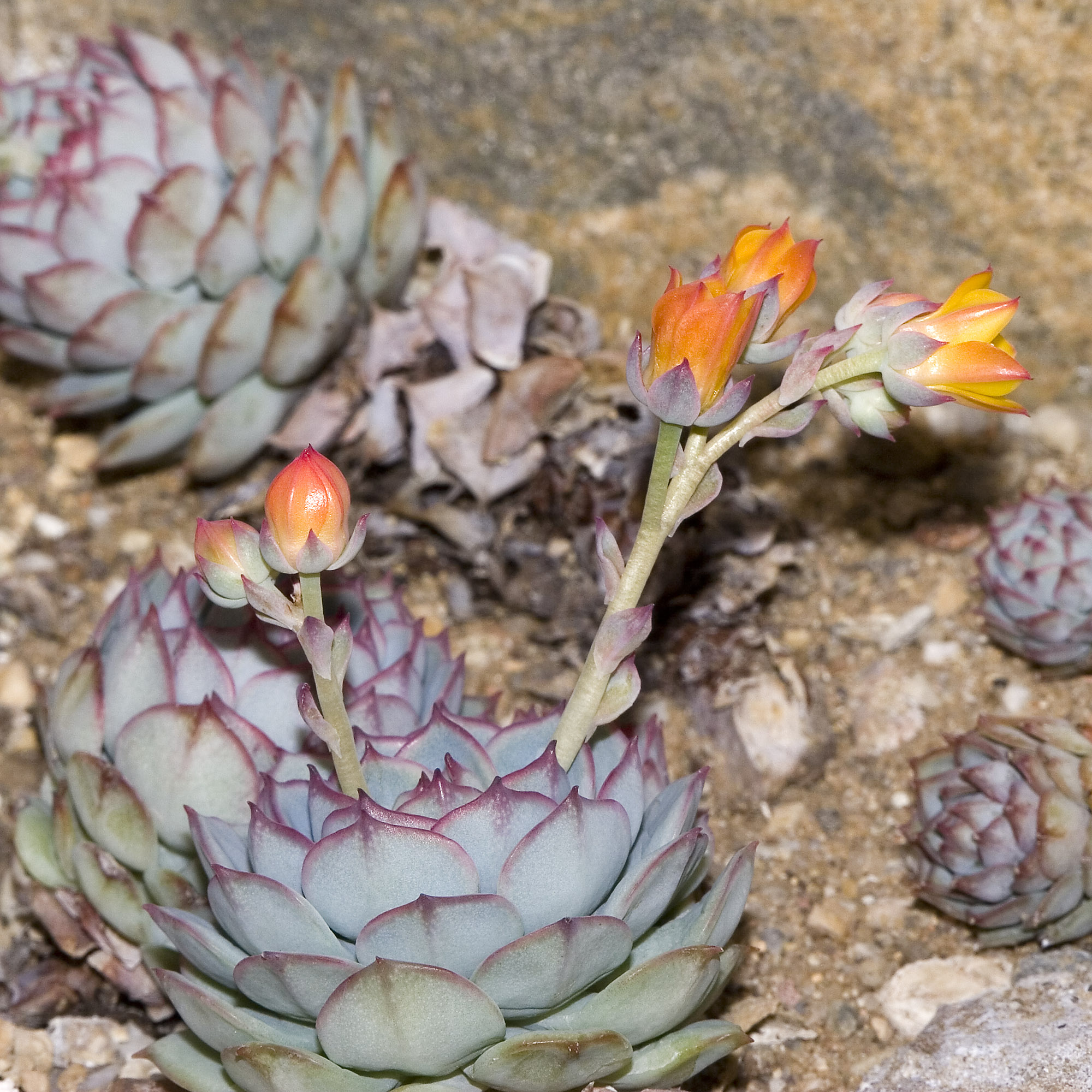
Echeveria derenbergii

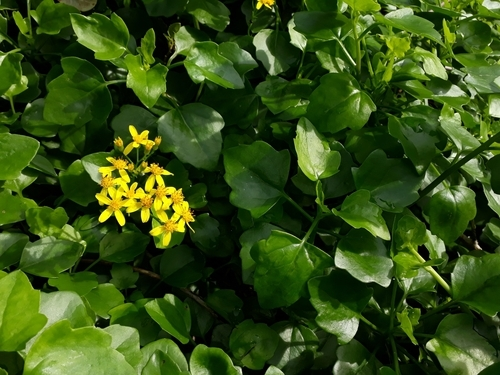
Senecio angulatus

There are approximately sixty different plant families that contain succulents.

Plant orders, families, and genera in which succulent species occur are listed below.

Order Alismatales

- Araceae: Zamioculcas, Synandrospadix, Philodendron martianum, Dracontium

Order Apiales

- Apiaceae: Azorella, Crithmum
- Araliaceae: Cussonia

Order Arecales (also called Principes)

- Arecaceae (also called Palmae) Jubaea

Order Asparagales

- Amaryllidaceae (geophytes): Amaryllis, Boophone, Clivia, Crinum, Cryptostephanus, Cyrtanthus, Haemanthus, Rauhia, Scadoxus, Stenomesson
- Asparagaceae
  - Agavoideae: Agave, Beschorneria, Furcraea, Hesperaloe, Hesperoyucca, Manfreda, Polianthes, Yucca
  - Lomandroideae: Cordyline
  - Convallarioideae: Beaucarnea, Calibanus, Dasylirion, Dracaena, Nolina
  - Scilloideae (Hyacinthaceae): Albuca, Bowiea, Daubenya, Drimia, Eucomis, Lachenalia, Ledebouria, Massonia, Muscari, Ornithogalum, Scilla, Urginea, Veltheimia
- Doryanthaceae: Doryanthes
- Orchidaceae: Acampe, Aerangis, Ansellia, Bolusiella, Bulbophyllum, Cirrhopetalum, Calanthe, Cyrtorchis, Dendrobium cucumerinum, Eulophia, Liparis, Oberonia, Oeceoclades, Polystachya, Tridactyle, Vanilla
- Asphodelaceae
  - subfamily Asphodeloideae: Aloe (succulents and succulent geophytes), Astroloba, Tulista, × Astrolista, Bulbine (succulent geophytes, succulents, and geophytes), Bulbinella (geophyte), Chortolirion (succulent geophytes), Gasteria, Gonialoe, Haworthia, Trachyandra (succulent geophytes and succulents),
  - subfamily Xanothorrhoeoidae: Xanthorrhoea

Order Asterales

- Asteraceae: Arctotheca, Baeriopsis, Chrysanthemoides, Coulterella, Crassocephalum, Curio, Delairea, Didelta, Emilia, Eremothamnus, Gymnodiscus, Gynura, Hillardiella (geophyte), Lopholaena, Monoculus, Nidorella, Osteospermum, Othonna (succulents and succulent geophytes), Phaneroglossa, Poecilolepis, Polyachyrus, Pteronia, Senecio, Solanecio, Tripteris
- Campanulaceae: Brighamia

Order Brassicales

- Brassicaceae: Heliophila, Lepidium
- Capparidaceae: Maerua
- Caricaceae: Carica, Jacarathia
- Moringaceae: Moringa
- Tiganophytaceae Tiganophyta karasense

Order Caryophyllales

- Aizoaceae: Corbichonia, Gisekia, Herreanthus, Limeum, Ophthalmophyllum, Saphesia
  - subfamily Aizooideae: Acrosanthes, Aizoanthemum, Aizoon, Galenia, Gunniopsis, Plinthus, Tetragonia
  - subfamily Mesembryanthemoideae (syn. Mesembryanthemaceae): Aptenia (synonym of Mesembryanthemum), Aridaria, Aspazoma, Brownanthus (synonym of Mesembryanthemum), Calamophyllum, Caulipsilon, Conophytum, Dactylopsis, Erepsia, Hameria, Hartmanthus, Hymenogyne, Marlothistela, Mesembryanthemum, Phiambolia, Phyllobolus, Prenia, Psilocaulon, Ruschiella, Sarozona, Synaptophyllum
  - subfamily Ruschioideae:
    - tribe Apatesieae: Apatesia, Carpanthea, Caryotophora, Conicosia, Hymenogyne, Saphesia, Skiatophytum
    - tribe Dorotheantheae: Aethephyllum Cleretum Dorotheanthus
    - tribe Ruschiae: Acrodon, Aloinopsis, Amphibolia, Antegibbaeum, Antimima, Arenifera, Argyroderma, Astridia, Bergeranthus, Bijlia, Braunsia, Brianhuntleya, Carpobrotus, Carruanthus, Cephalophyllum, Cerochlamys, Chasmatophyllum, Cheiridopsis, Circandra, Conophytum, Corpuscularia, Cylindrophyllum, Delosperma, Dicrocaulon, Didymaotus, Dinteranthus, Diplosoma, Disphyma, Dracophilus, Drosanthemum, Eberlanzia, Ebracteola, Enarganthe, Erepsia, Esterhuysenia, Faucaria, Fenestraria, Frithia, Gibbaeum, Glottiphyllum, Hallianthus, Hereroa, Ihlenfeldtia, Imitaria, Jacobsenia, Jensenobotrya, Jordaaniella, Juttadinteria, Khadia, Lampranthus, Lapidaria (plant), Leipoldtia, Lithops, Machairophyllum, Malephora, Mestoklema, Meyerophytum, Mitrophyllum, Monilaria, Mossia, Muiria, Namaquanthus, Namibia, Nananthus, Nelia, Neohenricia, Octopoma, Odontophorus, Oophytum, Ophthalmophyllum, Orthopterum, Oscularia, Ottosonderia, Pleiospilos, Psammophora, Rabiea, Rhinephyllum, Rhombophyllum, Ruschia, Ruschianthemum, Ruschianthus, Schlechteranthus, Schwantesia, Scopelogena, Smicrostigma, Stayneria, Stoeberia, Stomatium, Tanquana Titanopsis, Trichodiadema, Vanheerdea, Vanzijlia, Vlokia, Wooleya, Zeuktophyllum
  - subfamily Sesuvioideae: Cypselea, Sesuvium, Trianthema, Tribulocarpus, Zaleya
- Amaranthaceae:
  - subfamily Amaranthoideae: Arthraerva
  - subfamily Chenopodioideae (family Chenopodiaceae):) Atriplex, Chenopodium, Dissocarpus, Einadia, Enchylaena, Eremophea, Halopeplis, Maireana, Malacocera, Neobassia, Osteocarpum, Rhagodia, Roycea, Halosarcia, Salicornia, Salsola, Sarcocornia, Sclerochlamys, Sclerolaena, Suaeda, Tecticornia, Threlkeldia
- Anacampserotaceae: Anacampseros, Avonia, Grahamia
- Basellaceae: Anredera, Basella
- Cactaceae: Acanthocalycium, Acanthocereus, Ariocarpus, Armatocereus, Arrojadoa, Arthrocereus, Astrophytum, Austrocactus, Aztekium, Bergerocactus, Blossfeldia, Brachycereus, Browningia, Brasilicereus, Calymmanthium, Carnegiea, Cephalocereus, Cephalocleistocactus, Cereus, Cintia, Cipocereus, Cleistocactus, Coleocephalocereus, Copiapoa, Corryocactus, Coryphantha, Dendrocereus, Denmoza, Discocactus, Disocactus, Echinocactus, Echinocereus, Echinopsis, Epiphyllum, Epithelantha, Eriosyce, Escobaria, Escontria, Espostoa, Espostoopsis, Eulychnia, Facheiroa, Ferocactus, Frailea, Geohintonia, Gymnocalycium, Haageocereus, Harrisia, Hatiora, Hylocereus, Jasminocereus, Lasiocereus, Lepismium, Leptocereus, Leuchtenbergia, Lophophora, Maihuenia, Mammillaria, Matucana, Melocactus, Micranthocereus, Mila, Monvillea, Myrtillocactus, Neobuxbaumia, Neoraimondia, Neowerdermannia, Obregonia, Opuntia, Cylindropuntia, Oreocereus, Oroya, Ortegocactus, Pachycereus, Parodia, Pediocactus, Pelecyphora, Peniocereus, Pereskia, Pereskiopsis, Pilosocereus, Polaskia, Praecereus, Pseudoacanthocereus, Pseudorhipsalis, Pterocactus, Pygmaeocereus, Quiabentia, Rauhocereus, Rebutia, Rhipsalis, Schlumbergera, Sclerocactus, Selenicereus, Stenocactus, Stenocereus, Stephanocereus, Stetsonia, Strombocactus, Tacinga, Thelocactus, Trichocereus Turbinicarpus, Uebelmannia, Weberbauerocereus, Weberocereus
- Didiereaceae: Alluaudia, Alluaudiopsis, Calyptrotheca, Decarya, Didierea, Portulacaria
- Molluginaceae: Hypertelis
- Montiaceae: Cistanthe, Calandrinia, Erocallis, Lewisia, Parakeelya, Phemeranthus, Thingia
- Phytolaccaceae: Phytolacca
- Portulacaceae: Portulaca
- Talinaceae: Amphipetalum, Talinella, Talinum

Order Commelinales

- Commelinaceae: Aneilema, Callisia, Cyanotis, Tradescantia, Tripogandra

Order Cornales

- Loasaceae: Schismocarpus

Order Cucurbitales

- Begoniaceae: Begonia
- Cucurbitaceae: Acanthosicyos, Apodanthera, Brandegea, Cephalopentandra, Ceratosanthes, Citrullus, Coccinia, Corallocarpus, Cucumella, Cucumis, Cucurbita, Cyclantheropsis, Dactyliandra, Dendrosicyos, Doyera, Eureindra, Fevillea, Gerrardanthus, Gynostemma, Halosicyos, Ibervillea, Kedostris, Lagenaria, Marah, Momordica, Neoalsomitra, Odosicyos, Parasicyos, Syrigia, Telfairia, Trochomeria, Trochomeriopsis, Tumamoca, Xerosicyos, Zehneria, Zygosicyos

Order Dioscoreales

- Dioscoreaceae: Dioscorea

Order Ericales

- Balsaminaceae: Impatiens
- Ericaceae: Sphyrospermum
- Fouquieriaceae: Fouquieria

Order Fabales

- Fabaceae: Delonix, Dolichos, Erythrina, Lotononis, Lupinus, Neorautanenia, Pachyrhizus, Tylosema

Order Filicales

- Polypodiaceae: Drymoglossum niphoboloides, Lecanopteris carnosa

Order Gentianales

- Apocynaceae: Adenium, Mandevilla, Pachypodium, Plumeria
  - subfamily Asclepiadoideae (syn. Asclepiadaceae): Absolmsia, Australluma, Aspidoglossum, Aspidonepsis, Baynesia, Brachystelma, Ceropegia, Chlorocyathus, Cibirhiza, Cordylogyne, Cynanchum, Dischidia, Dischidiopsis, Duvaliandra, Eustegia, Fanninia, Fockea, Glossostelma, Hoya, Ischnolepis, Lavrania, Marsdenia, Miraglossum, Odontostelma, Ophionella, Orbeanthus, Pachycarpus, Parapodium, Periglossum, Petopentia, Raphionacme, Riocreuxia, Sarcorrhiza, Schizoglossum, Schlechterella, Stathmostelma, Stenostelma, Stomatostemma, Trachycalymma, Trichocaulon, Tylophora (now in Vincetoxicum), Woodia, Xysmalobium
    - tribe Asclepiadeae:
      - subtribe Asclepiadoideae: Asclepias,
      - subtribe Gonolobinae: Matelea,
    - tribe Maxillarieae:
      - subtribe Lycastinae: Rudolfiella
    - tribe Stapelieae: Angolluma, Caralluma, Desmidorchis, Duvalia, Echidnopsis, Edithcolea, Frerea, Hoodia, Huernia, Huerniopsis, Larryleachia, Notechidnopsis, Orbea (plant), Orbeopsis, Piaranthus, Pachycymbium, Pectinaria, Pseudolithos, Pseudopectinaria, Quaqua, Rhytidocaulon, Stapelia, Stapelianthus, Stapeliopsis, Tavaresia, Tridentea, Tromotriche, Whitesloanea
  - subfamily Periplocoideae:
    - tribe Cryptolepideae: Cryptolepis
- Rubiaceae: Anthorrhiza, Anthospermum, Hydnophytum, Hydrophylax, Myrmecodia, Myrmephytum, Phylohydrax, Squamellaria

Order Geraniales

- Geraniaceae: Monsonia, Pelargonium (succulents and geophytes), Sarcocaulon

Order Lamiales

- Gesneriaceae: Aeschynanthus, Alsobia, Chirita, Codonanthe, Columnea, Nematanthus, Sinningia, Streptocarpus
- Lamiaceae: Aeollanthus, Dauphinea, Perrierastrum, Plectranthus, Rotheca, Solenostemon, Tetradenia, Thorncroftia
- Lentibulariaceae
- Pedaliaceae: Holubia, Pterodiscus, Sesamothamnus, Uncarina

Order Malpighiales

- Euphorbiaceae: Cnidoscolus, Euphorbia, Jatropha, Monadenium, Pedilanthus, Synadenium
- Passifloraceae: Adenia
- Phyllanthaceae: Phyllanthus

Order Malvales

- Cochlospermaceae
- Malvaceae: Adansonia, Cavanillesia, Ceiba, Pseudobombax
  - subgroup Sterculiaceae: Brachychiton, Sterculia

Order Myrtales

- Melastomataceae: Medinilla

Order Oxalidales

- Oxalidaceae (geophytes): Oxalis

Order Piperales

- Piperaceae: Peperomia

Order Poales

- Bromeliaceae: Abromeitiella, Aechmea, Ananas, Catopsis, Connellia, Dyckia, Hechtia, Neoregelia, Puya, Tillandsia, Vriesea
- Poaceae: Dregeochloa, Laobambos

Order Polypodiales

- Polypodiaceae: Lecanopteris

Order Ranunculales

- Menispermaceae: Chasmanthera, Stephania, Tinospora

Order Rosales

- Moraceae: Dorstenia, Ficus
- Urticaceae: Laportea, Obetia, Pilea, Pouzolzia, Sarcopilea

Order Santalales

- Loranthaceae: Actinanthella, Agelanthus, Erianthemum, Helixanthera, Moquiniella, Oncocalyx, Pedistylis, Plicosepalus, Septulina, Tapinanthus, Vanwykia
- Viscaceae (syn. Santalaceae): Viscum

Order Sapindales

- Anacardiaceae: Operculicaria, Pachycormus
- Burseraceae: Boswellia, Bursera, Commiphora
- Meliaceae: Entandrophragma
- Sapindaceae: Erythrophysa

Order Saxifragales

- Crassulaceae: Adromischus, Aeonium,

Afrovivella,Aichryson, Cotyledon, Crassula, Cremnophila, Dudleya, Echeveria, Graptopetalum, Greenovia, Hylotelephium, Kalanchoe, Kungia, Lenophyllum, Meterostachys, Monanthes, Mucizonia, Orostachys, Pachyphytum, Perrierosedum, Petrosedum, Phedimus, Pistorinia, Prometheum, Pseudosedum, Rhodiola, Rosularia, Sedella, Sedum, Sempervivum, Sinocrassula, Thompsonella, Tylecodon, Umbilicus, Villadia

- Saxifragaceae: Micranthes, Saxifraga

Order Solanales

- Convolvulaceae: Ipomoea, Merremia, Stictocardia, Turbina (plant)
- Solanaceae: Nolana

Order Vitales

- Vitaceae: Cissus, Cyphostemma, Vitis

Order Zygophyllales

- Zygophyllaceae: Augea, Seetzenia, Zygophyllum

(unplaced order)* Boraginaceae: Heliotropium (unplaced order)* Icacinaceae: Pyrenacantha (geophyte)

There also were some succulent gymnosperms (but extinct since the end of the Cretaceous):

Order Pinales

- Cheirolepidiaceae:

Frenelopsis, Pseudofrenelopsis, Suturovagina, Glenrosa

For some families and subfamilies, most members are succulent; for example the Cactaceae, Agavoideae, Aizoaceae, and Crassulaceae.

The table below shows the number of succulent species found in some families and their native habitat:

Family or subfamily	Succulent #	Modified parts	Distribution
Agavoideae	300	Leaf	North and Central America
Cactaceae	1600	Stem (root, leaf)	The Americas
Crassulaceae	1300	Leaf (root)	Worldwide
Aizoaceae	2000	Leaf	Southern Africa, Oceania, Chile
Apocynaceae	500	Stem	Africa, Arabia, India, Australia
Asphodelaceae	500+	Leaf	Africa, Madagascar, Australia
Didiereaceae	11	Stem	Madagascar (endemic)
Euphorbiaceae	> 1000	Stem or leaf or root	Australia, Africa, Madagascar, Asia, the Americas, Europe
Portulacaceae	~500	Leaf and stem	The Americas, Australia, Africa
Cheirolepidiaceae	4, maybe more	Leaf	Worldwide, except Antarctica

== Cultivation ==
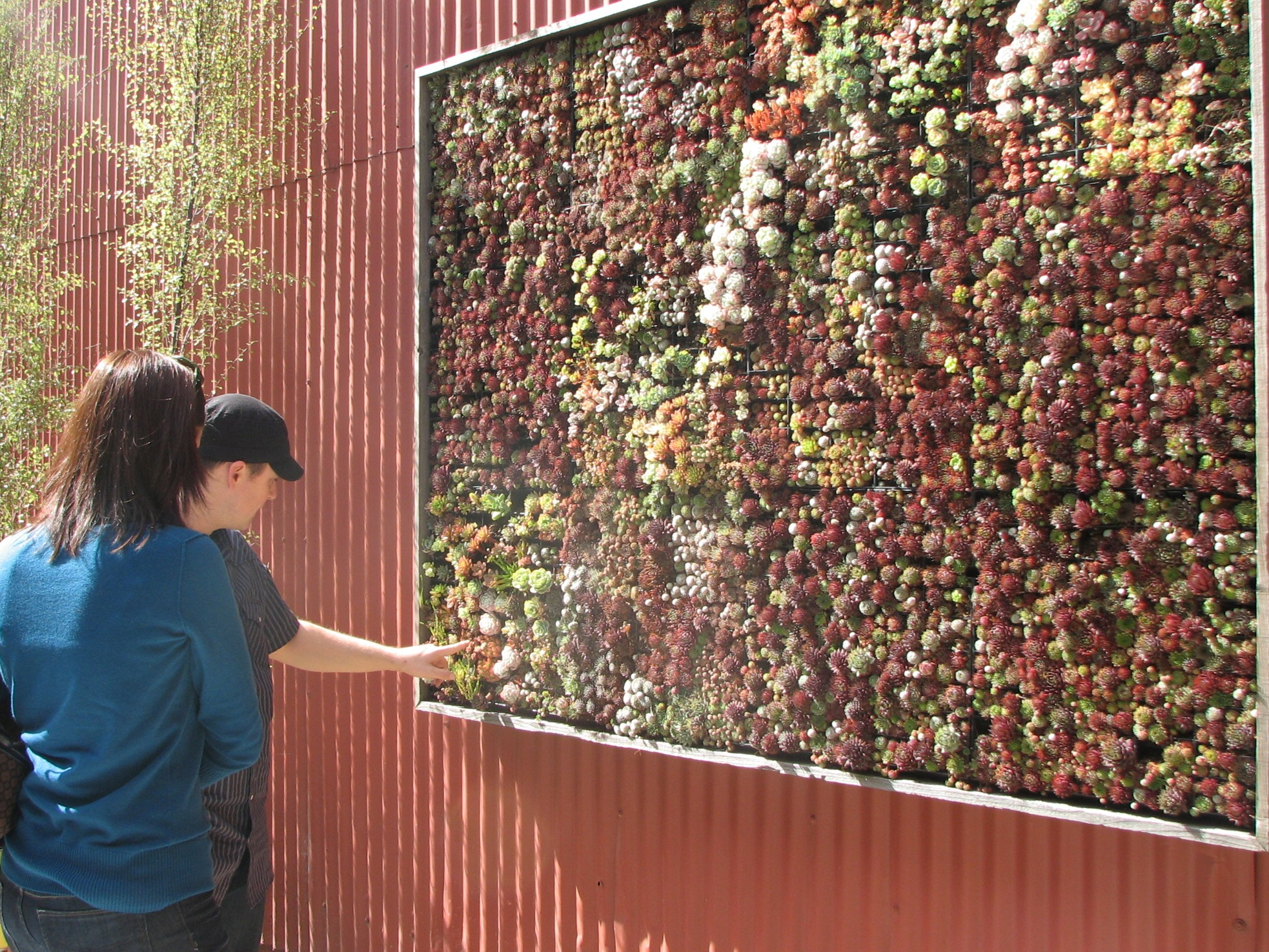
A succulent wall in a nursery in San Francisco, United States consisting of Sempervivum, Echeveria, and Crassula

Succulents are favored as houseplants for their attractiveness and ease of care. They have been cultivated as houseplants since at least the 17th century. If properly potted, succulents require little maintenance to survive indoors. Succulents are very adaptable houseplants and will thrive in a range of indoor conditions. For most plant owners, over-watering and associated infections are the main cause of death in succulents.

Succulents can be propagated in a number of ways, with vegetative propagation being the most common. This includes cuttings, where a few centimetres of the leafy stem is cut off and left to heal, forming a callus. Following a period of approximately seven days, roots may begin to develop. A second method is division consisting of uprooting an overgrown clump and pulling the stems and roots apart.

A third method is propagation by leaf by allowing the formation of a callus. During this method, a bottom leaf is fully removed from the plant often by twisting or cutting. The leaf then dries out and a callus forms preventing the leaf from absorbing too much moisture and rotting. This method typically takes up to a few weeks to produce healthy roots that would eventually create new plants. The vegetative propagation can be different according to the species.

== See also ==
- Cactus and Succulent Society of America
- Crassulacean acid metabolism

== Bibliography ==
- Anderson, Miles (1999), Cacti and Succulents : Illustrated Encyclopedia, Oxford: Sebastian Kelly, ISBN 978-1-84081-253-4
- Beentje, Henk (2010), The Kew Plant Glossary, Richmond, Surrey: Royal Botanic Gardens, Kew, ISBN 978-1-84246-422-9
- Compton, R.H., ed. (n.d.), Our South African Flora, Cape Times Ltd, OCLC 222867742 (publication date also given as 1930s or 1940s)
- Hecht, Hans (1994), Cacti & Succulents (p/b ed.), New York: Sterling, ISBN 978-0-8069-0549-5
- Hewitt, Terry (1993), The Complete Book of Cacti & Succulents, London: Covent Garden Books, ISBN 978-1-85605-402-7
- Innes, Clive & Wall, Bill (1995), Cacti, Succulents and Bromeliads, London: Cassell for the Royal Horticultural Society, ISBN 978-0-304-32076-9
- Jacobsen, Hermann (1960), A Handbook of Succulent Plants (Vols 1–3), Poole, Dorset: Blandford Press, ISBN 978-0-7137-0140-1
- Martin, Margaret J. & Chapman, Peter R. (1977), Succulents and their cultivation, London: Faber & Faber, ISBN 978-0-571-10221-1
- Rowley, Gordon D. (1980), Name that Succulent, Cheltenham, Glos.: Stanley Thornes, ISBN 978-0-85950-447-8
