= Neoalsomitra podagrica =

Scientific classification
- Kingdom: Plantae
- Clade: Tracheophytes
- Clade: Angiosperms
- Clade: Eudicots
- Clade: Rosids
- Order: Cucurbitales
- Family: Cucurbitaceae
- Genus: Neoalsomitra
- Species: N. podagrica

Binomial name
- Neoalsomitra podagrica Steenis

Species of plant

Neoalsomitra podagrica is a vine in the family Cucurbitaceae. It is native to the East Indies. It has a tuberous, succulent base up to 1 m (3 ft 3 in) high, and lower limbs up to 10 cm (4 in) thick, bearing large prickles. It has been known only since 1955.
