= Vlokia ater =

Scientific classification
- Kingdom: Plantae
- Clade: Tracheophytes
- Clade: Angiosperms
- Clade: Eudicots
- Order: Caryophyllales
- Family: Aizoaceae
- Genus: Vlokia
- Species: V. ater

Binomial name
- Vlokia ater S.A.Hammer

Species of succulent

Vlokia ater was the first species described for the genus Vlokia in the Aizoaceae plant family. The genus name (generic epithet) honors the discoverer, South African botanist, Jan H. J. Vlok (1957-). The species name (specific epithet) derives from the Latin adjective "ater" for "black" and refers to the black coloring which older leaf leaves assume.

== Description ==
The first description of the genus and species was published in 1994 by Steven A. Hammer (S.A.Hammer) (1951-).

Vlokia ater is a perennial succulent plant. It has short stems, which usually bear a single leaf pair. Its growth habit is compact to spreading.

The leaves are small, dotted, grayish-green to brownish-green and remain on the plants for several years turning dull black. They are about 10 mm (0.4 in) long, as well as about 8 mm (0.3 in) wide and thick. The leaves are fused together and enclose the stem.

The solitary flower is carried in a bract which sits on a short pedicel. There are six sepals. The mauve to rose-pink petals do not spread wide and are 4–5 mm (0.16–0.20 in) long and 1.5 mm (0.06 in) wide. Numerous (up to 80), pink or white staminodes surround the approximately 16 stamens. The nectaries form a dark green ring.

Vlokia ater blooms in early spring (August–September in habitat). The short-lived flowers open at noon and close at dusk.

The fruits are usually six- (rarely five- or seven-) fold and often blacken with increasing age. The seeds are very dark brown, pear-shaped and very hard.

== Systematics and distribution ==
The distribution range of Vlokia ater is a small area at Montagu in the western Little Karoo of Western Cape, South Africa. It grows in open areas of the Fynbos in shallow pans of decomposing quartzite at an altitude of about 1,300 m (4,300 ft). The annual rainfall is around 300 mm (12 in), with most falling in March and November.

The Red List of South African Plants at the South African National Biodiversity Institute describes Vlokia ater as 'critically rare'.
