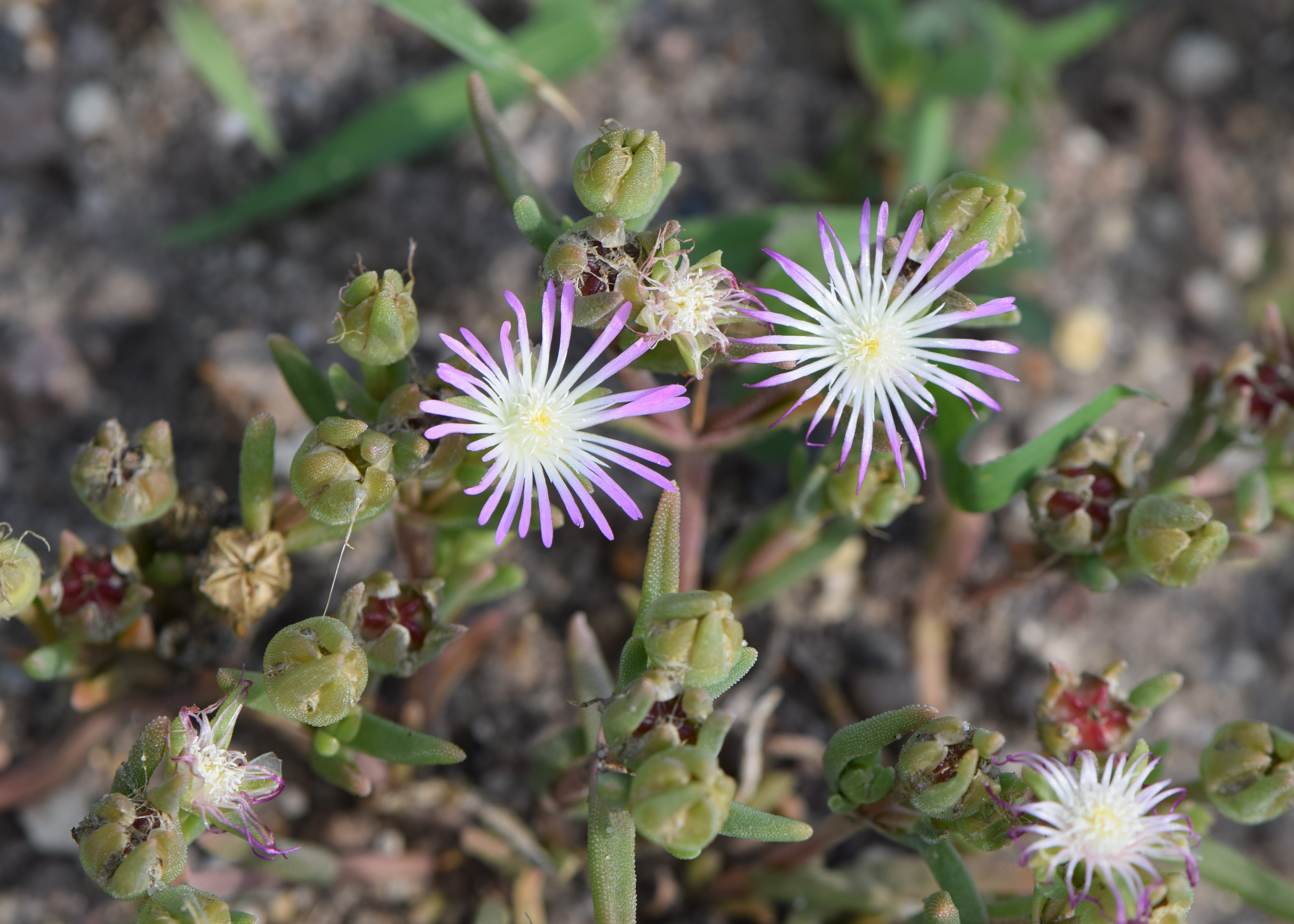

Scientific classification
- Kingdom: Plantae
- Clade: Embryophytes
- Clade: Tracheophytes
- Clade: Spermatophytes
- Clade: Angiosperms
- Clade: Eudicots
- Order: Caryophyllales
- Family: Aizoaceae
- Genus: Ebracteola
- Species: E. derenbergiana

Binomial name
- Ebracteola derenbergiana (Dinter) Dinter & Schwantes

Synonyms
- Bergeranthus derenbergianus (Dinter) Schwantes; Ebracteola candida L.Bolus; Ebracteola vallis-pacis Dinter ex Range; Mesembryanthemum derenbergianum Dinter; Mesembryanthemum vallis-pacis Dinter ex Range; Ruschia derenbergiana (Dinter) C.Weber

= Ebracteola derenbergiana =

Species of succulent

Ebracteola derenbergiana is a succulent plant in the Aizoaceae family. The species is native to Namibia and South Africa. In South Africa, it occurs in the Northern Cape and in Namibia in the south.
