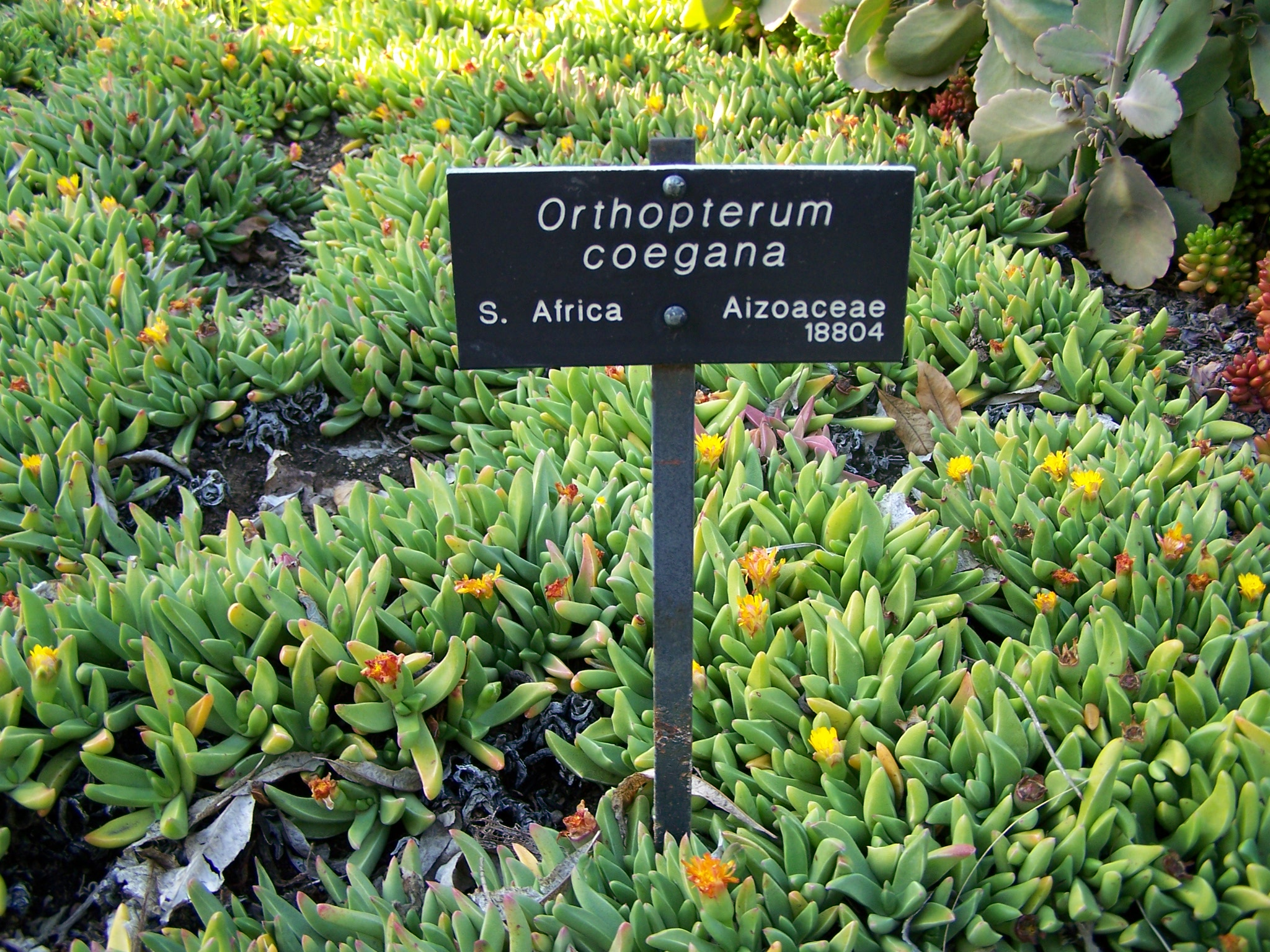

Scientific classification
- Kingdom: Plantae
- Clade: Tracheophytes
- Clade: Angiosperms
- Clade: Eudicots
- Order: Caryophyllales
- Family: Aizoaceae
- Genus: Orthopterum
- Species: O. coeganum

Binomial name
- Orthopterum coeganum L.Bolus

= Orthopterum coeganum =

Species of succulent

Orthopterum coeganum is a small succulent plant in the Aizoaceae family. The species is endemic to South Africa and occurs in the Eastern Cape. The plant has a range of less than 10 km² and is found in the Sundays River in the Albany Bush Ecoregion. Large parts of the plant's habitat have been destroyed by quarrying and industrialization. Only two of the three original subpopulations remain. The species is still threatened.
