= Ruschiella henricii =

Scientific classification
- Kingdom: Plantae
- Clade: Tracheophytes
- Clade: Angiosperms
- Clade: Eudicots
- Order: Caryophyllales
- Family: Aizoaceae
- Genus: Ruschiella
- Species: R. henricii

Binomial name
- Ruschiella henricii (L.Bolus) Klak

Synonyms
- Lampranthus henricii (L.Bolus) N.E.Br.; Mesembryanthemum henricii L.Bolus

Species of succulent

Ruschiella henricii is a succulent plant in the Aizoaceae family. The species is endemic to South Africa in the Western Cape.
