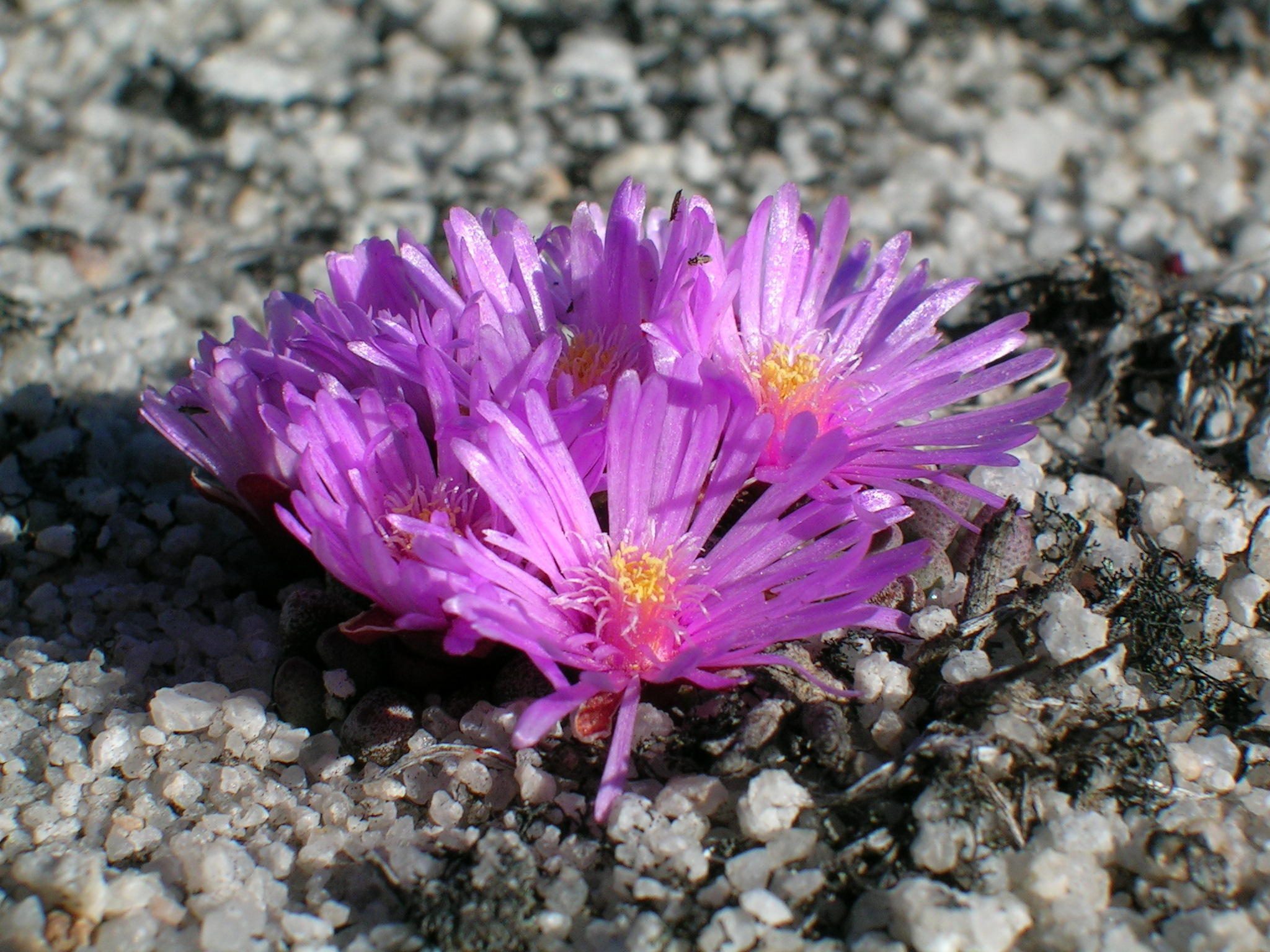

Scientific classification
- Kingdom: Plantae
- Clade: Tracheophytes
- Clade: Angiosperms
- Clade: Eudicots
- Order: Caryophyllales
- Family: Aizoaceae
- Genus: Vlokia
- Species: V. montana

Binomial name
- Vlokia montana Klak

= Vlokia montana =

Species of succulent

Vlokia montana is a succulent plant that is part of the Aizoaceae family. The species is endemic to the Western Cape and occurs in the Keeromsberg and Kwadousberge. The plant has an area of occurrence of 2 km² and is considered rare.
