= Ebracteola fulleri =

Scientific classification
- Kingdom: Plantae
- Clade: Tracheophytes
- Clade: Angiosperms
- Clade: Eudicots
- Order: Caryophyllales
- Family: Aizoaceae
- Genus: Ebracteola
- Species: E. fulleri

Binomial name
- Ebracteola fulleri (L.Bolus) Glen, (1986)

Synonyms
- Ruschia fulleri L.Bolus

Species of succulent

Ebracteola fulleri is a succulent plant in the Aizoaceae family. The species is native to Namibia and South Africa. In South Africa, it occurs in the Northern Cape and in Namibia in the south.
