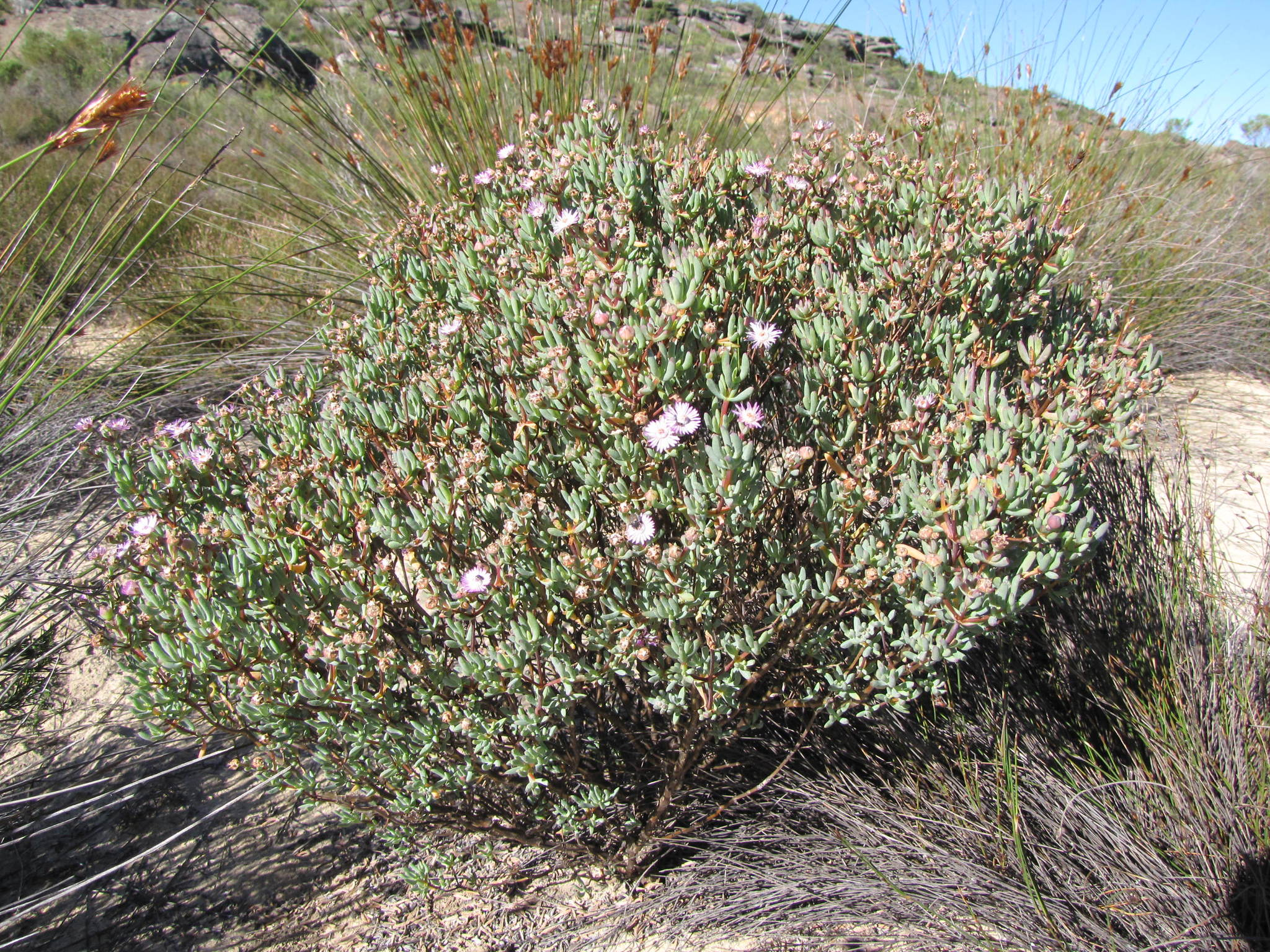

Scientific classification
- Kingdom: Plantae
- Clade: Tracheophytes
- Clade: Angiosperms
- Clade: Eudicots
- Order: Caryophyllales
- Family: Aizoaceae
- Genus: Ruschiella
- Species: R. lunulata

Binomial name
- Ruschiella lunulata (A.Berger) Klak

Synonyms
- Lampranthus lunulatus (A.Berger) L.Bolus; Mesembryanthemum lunulatum A.Berger

= Ruschiella lunulata =

Species of succulent

Ruschiella lunulata is a succulent plant in the Aizoaceae family. The species is endemic to South Africa and occurs in the Western Cape.
