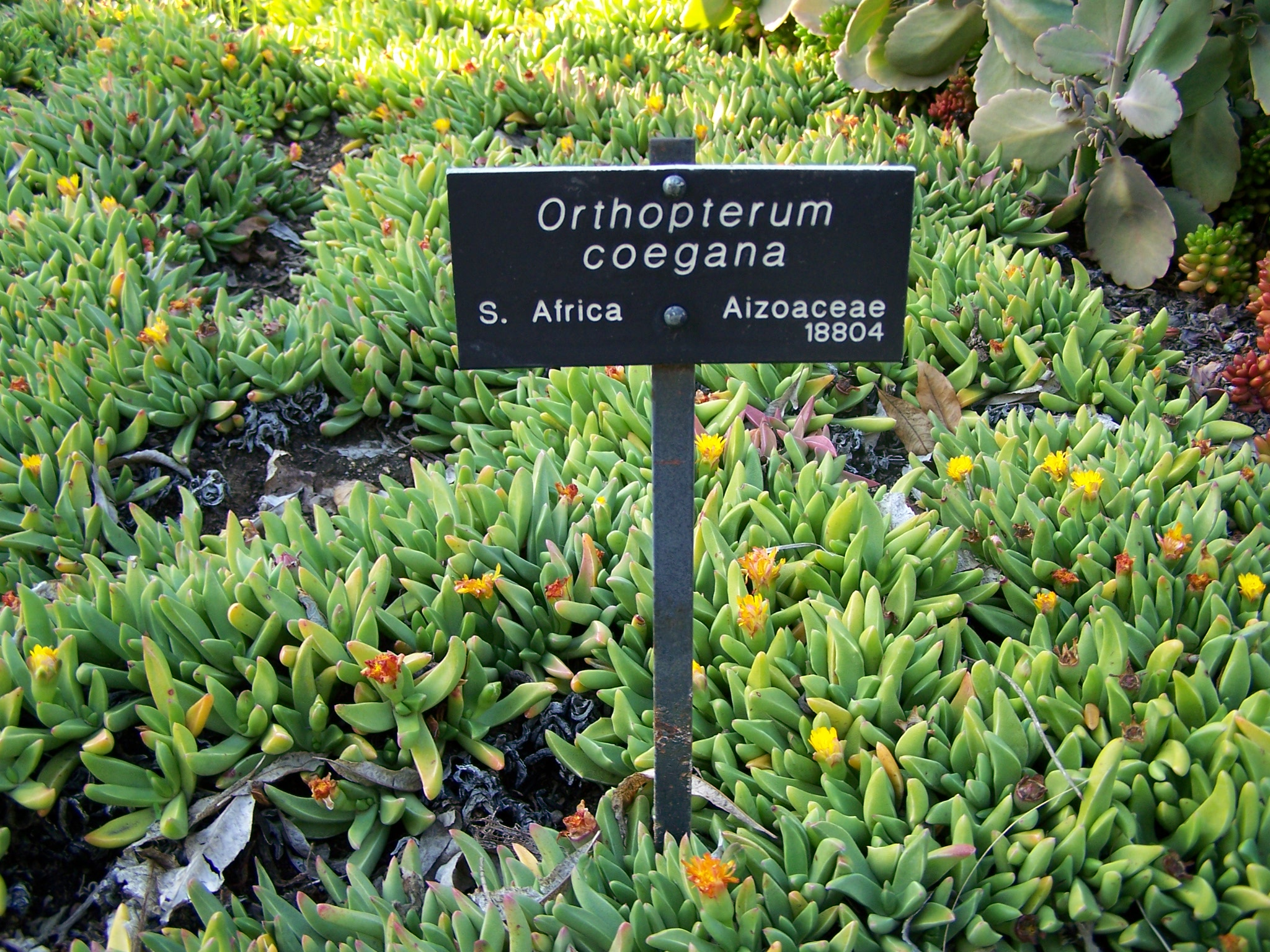
- Specimen of Orthopterum coeganum at Huntington Botanical Desert Garden

Scientific classification
- Kingdom: Plantae
- Clade: Tracheophytes
- Clade: Angiosperms
- Clade: Eudicots
- Order: Caryophyllales
- Family: Aizoaceae
- Subfamily: Ruschioideae
- Tribe: Ruschieae
- Genus: Orthopterum; L.Bolus

= Orthopterum =

Genus of succulents

Orthopterum is a genus of succulent plant in the family Aizoaceae, subfamily Ruschioideae. It is a low, clump-forming plant with thick, fleshy leaves and yellow flowers. It is endemic to the Cape Provinces of South Africa.

== Species ==
Two species are accepted.

- Orthopterum coeganum L.Bolus
- Orthopterum waltoniae L.Bolus
