= Ebracteola montis-moltkei =

Scientific classification
- Kingdom: Plantae
- Clade: Tracheophytes
- Clade: Angiosperms
- Clade: Eudicots
- Order: Caryophyllales
- Family: Aizoaceae
- Genus: Ebracteola
- Species: E. montis-moltkei

Binomial name
- Ebracteola montis-moltkei (Dinter) Dinter & Schwantes

Synonyms
- Bergeranthus montis-moltkei (Dinter) Schwantes; Hereroa vallis-pacis Dinter ex Schwantes; Mesembryanthemum montis-moltkei Dinter; Mesembryanthemum renniei L.Bolus; Ruschia renniei (L.Bolus) Schwantes

Species of succulent

Ebracteola montis-moltkei is a succulent plant in the Aizoaceae family. The species is endemic to central Namibia.
