= Ebracteola wilmaniae =

Scientific classification
- Kingdom: Plantae
- Clade: Tracheophytes
- Clade: Angiosperms
- Clade: Eudicots
- Order: Caryophyllales
- Family: Aizoaceae
- Genus: Ebracteola
- Species: E. wilmaniae

Binomial name
- Ebracteola wilmaniae (L.Bolus) Glen, (1986)

Synonyms
- Mesembryanthemum vermeuleniae L.Bolus; Mesembryanthemum wilmaniae L.Bolus; Ruschia wilmaniae (L.Bolus) L.Bolus

Species of succulent

Ebracteola wilmaniae is a succulent plant in the Aizoaceae family. The species is endemic to South Africa.
