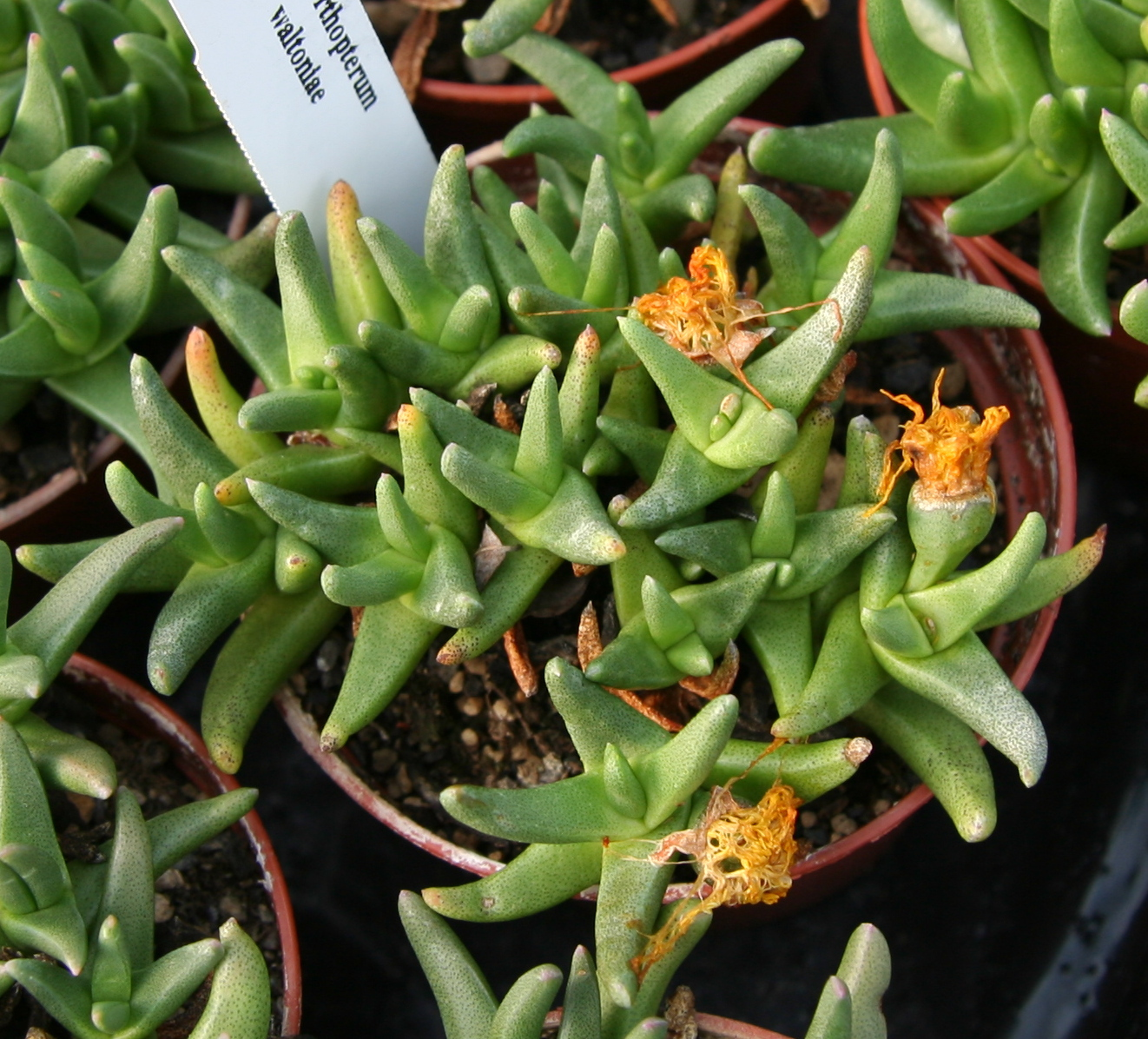

Scientific classification
- Kingdom: Plantae
- Clade: Tracheophytes
- Clade: Angiosperms
- Clade: Eudicots
- Order: Caryophyllales
- Family: Aizoaceae
- Genus: Orthopterum
- Species: O. waltoniae

Binomial name
- Orthopterum waltoniae L.Bolus

= Orthopterum waltoniae =

Species of succulent

Orthopterum waltoniae is a small succulent plant in the Aizoaceae family. The species is endemic to South Africa and occurs in the Eastern Cape. The plant has a range of 1 815 km² and occurs from Addo to Grahamstown. It is part of the Albany Bush Ecoregion.
