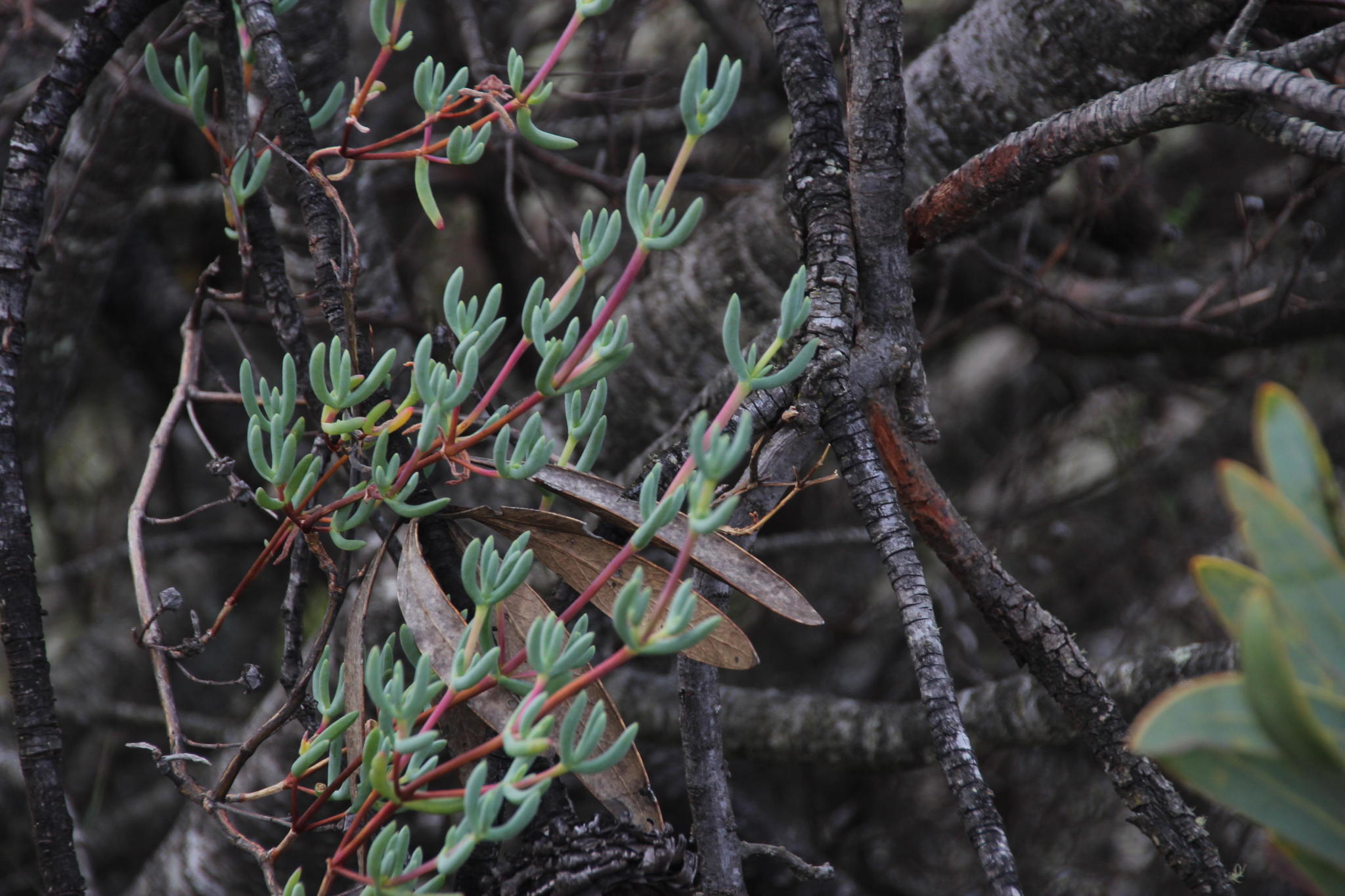

Scientific classification
- Kingdom: Plantae
- Clade: Tracheophytes
- Clade: Angiosperms
- Clade: Eudicots
- Order: Caryophyllales
- Family: Aizoaceae
- Genus: Ruschiella
- Species: R. argentea

Binomial name
- Ruschiella argentea (L.Bolus) Klak

Synonyms
- Lampranthus argenteus (L.Bolus) L.Bolus; Mesembryanthemum argenteum L.Bolus

= Ruschiella argentea =

Species of succulent

Ruschiella argentea is a succulent plant in the Aizoaceae family. The species is endemic to South Africa in the Western Cape.
