= Ruschiella cedrimontana =

Scientific classification
- Kingdom: Plantae
- Clade: Tracheophytes
- Clade: Angiosperms
- Clade: Eudicots
- Order: Caryophyllales
- Family: Aizoaceae
- Genus: Ruschiella
- Species: R. cedrimontana

Binomial name
- Ruschiella cedrimontana Klak

Species of succulent

Ruschiella cedrimontana is a succulent plant in the Aizoaceae family. The species is endemic to South Africa in the Western Cape.
