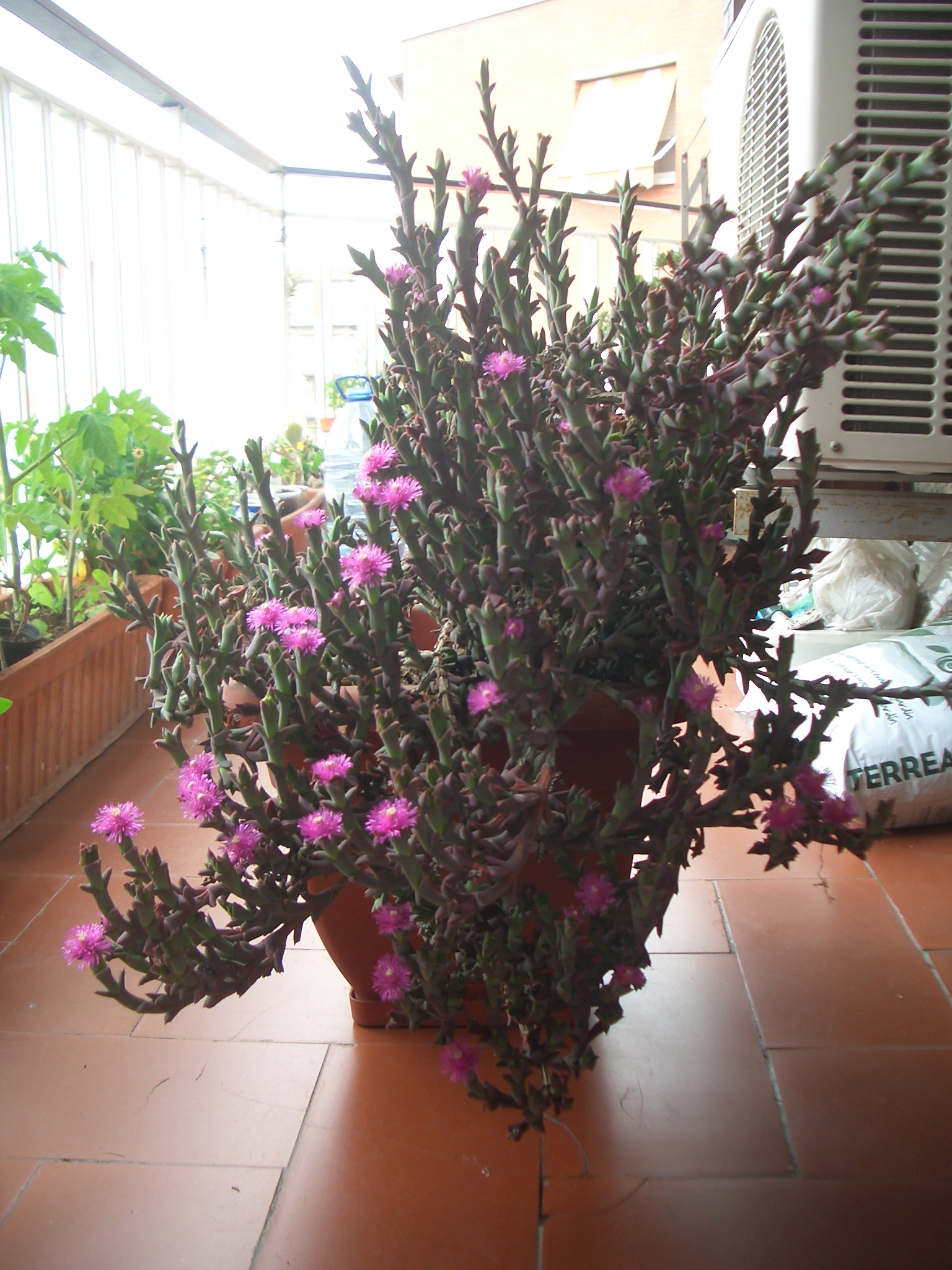
- Smicrostigma viride with flowers

Scientific classification
- Kingdom: Plantae
- Clade: Tracheophytes
- Clade: Angiosperms
- Clade: Eudicots
- Order: Caryophyllales
- Family: Aizoaceae
- Genus: Smicrostigma
- Species: S. viride

Binomial name
- Smicrostigma viride (Haw.) N.E.Br.

Synonyms
- Erepsia viridis (Haw.) L.Bolus (1927); Mesembryanthemum integrum L.Bolus (1922); Mesembryanthemum subaduncum Haw. (1819); Mesembryanthemum viride Haw. (1795); Ruschia integra (L.Bolus) Schwantes (1926); Ruschia viridis (Haw.) G.D.Rowley (1978)

= Smicrostigma viride =

Genus of plants

Smicrostigma viride is a species of flowering plant belonging to the family Aizoaceae. It is a succulent shrub or subshrub native to the southwestern Cape Provinces of South Africa.
