= Hymenogyne =

Scientific classification
- Kingdom: Plantae
- Clade: Tracheophytes
- Clade: Angiosperms
- Clade: Eudicots
- Order: Caryophyllales
- Family: Aizoaceae
- Subfamily: Ruschioideae
- Tribe: Apatesieae
- Genus: Hymenogyne; Haw.

Genus of plants

Hymenogyne is a genus of flowering plants belonging to the family Aizoaceae. It is endemic to the Cape Provinces of South Africa.

Two species are accepted.

- Hymenogyne conica L.Bolus
- Hymenogyne glabra (Aiton) Haw.
