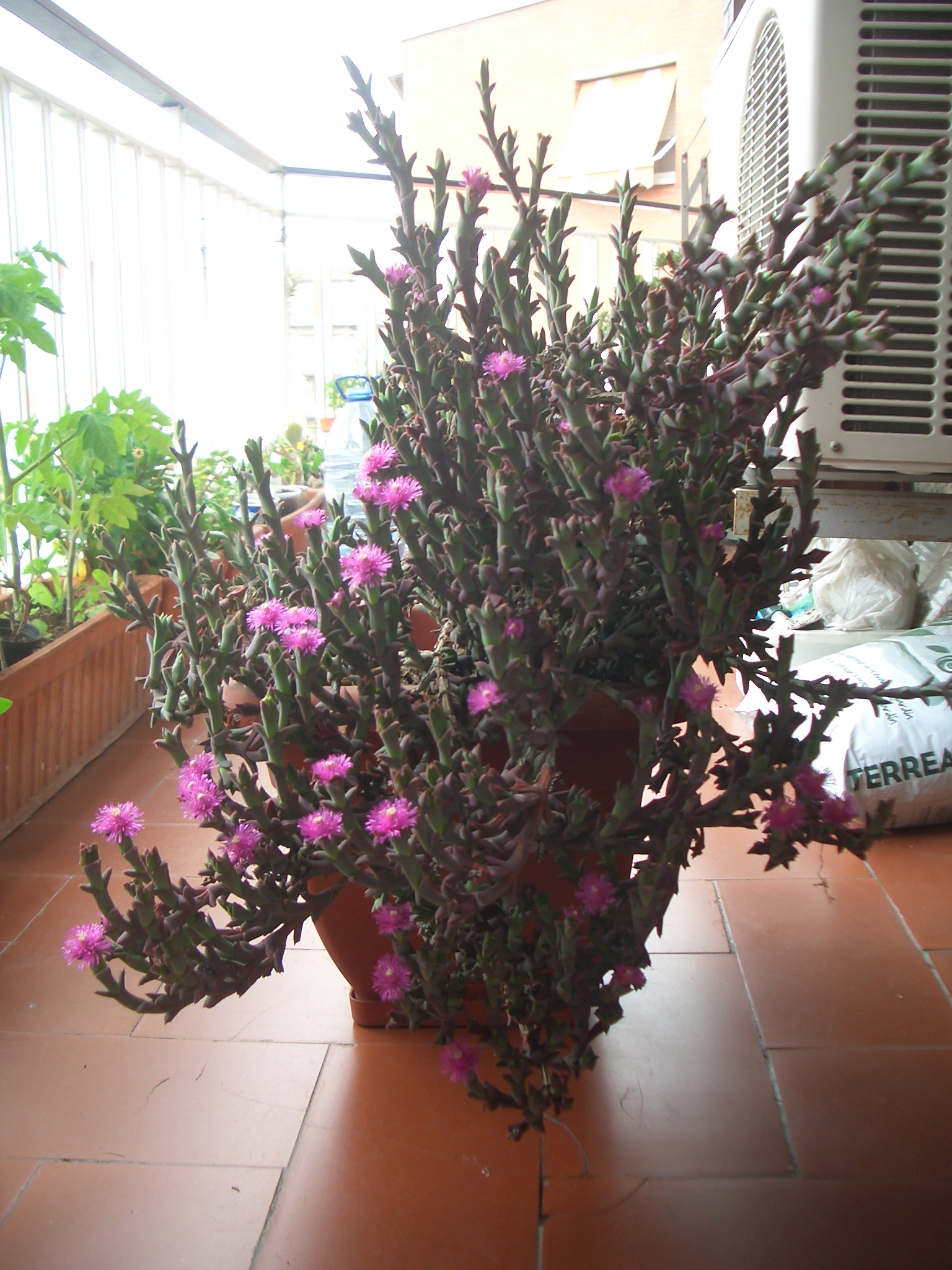
- Smicrostigma viride with flowers

Scientific classification
- Kingdom: Plantae
- Clade: Tracheophytes
- Clade: Angiosperms
- Clade: Eudicots
- Order: Caryophyllales
- Family: Aizoaceae
- Subfamily: Ruschioideae
- Tribe: Ruschieae
- Genus: Smicrostigma; N.E.Br. (1930)

Species
- Smicrostigma viride (Haw.) N.E.Br.; Smicrostigma warmwaterbergense Klak

= Smicrostigma =

Genus of flowering plants

Smicrostigma is a genus of flowering plants in the family Aizoaceae. It includes two species native to the Cape Provinces of South Africa.

- Smicrostigma viride (Haw.) N.E.Br.
- Smicrostigma warmwaterbergense Klak
