= Ebracteola =

Scientific classification
- Kingdom: Plantae
- Clade: Tracheophytes
- Clade: Angiosperms
- Clade: Eudicots
- Order: Caryophyllales
- Family: Aizoaceae
- Subfamily: Ruschioideae
- Tribe: Ruschieae
- Genus: Ebracteola; Dinter & Schwantes

Genus of flowering plants

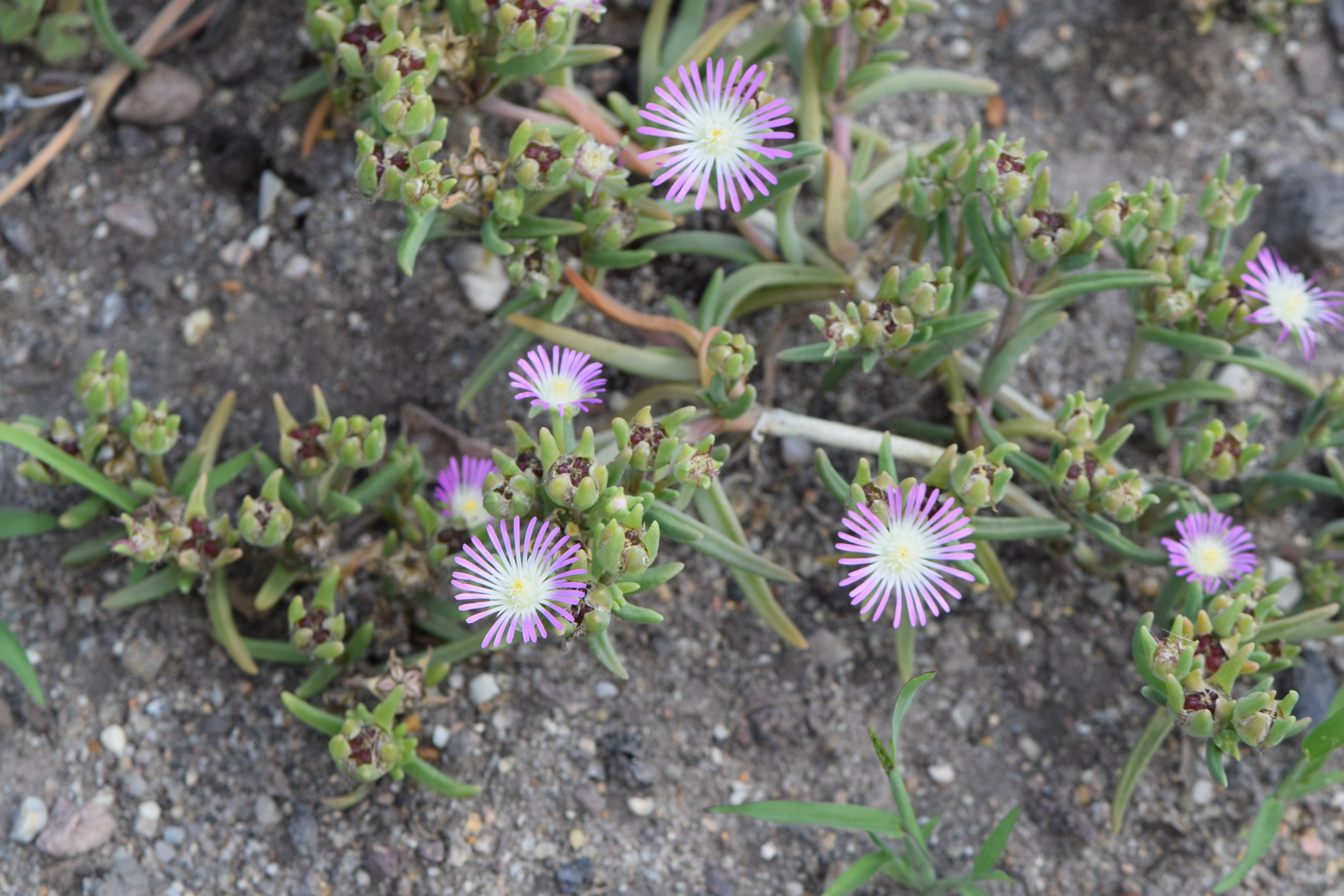
Ebracteola derenbergiana in the Botanischer Garten Halle, Berlin, 2022.

Ebracteola is a genus of flowering plants belonging to the family Aizoaceae.

It is native to Namibia and the Cape Provinces, Free State, and Northern Provinces of South Africa.

Species:

- Ebracteola derenbergiana (Dinter) Dinter & Schwantes
- Ebracteola fulleri (L.Bolus) Glen
- Ebracteola montis-moltkei (Dinter) Dinter & Schwantes
- Ebracteola wilmaniae (L.Bolus) Glen
