= Saphesia =

Scientific classification
- Kingdom: Plantae
- Clade: Tracheophytes
- Clade: Angiosperms
- Clade: Eudicots
- Order: Caryophyllales
- Family: Aizoaceae
- Subfamily: Ruschioideae
- Tribe: Apatesieae
- Genus: Saphesia; N.E.Br.
- Species: S. flaccida

Binomial name
- Saphesia flaccida (Jacq.) N.E.Br.

Genus of flowering plants

Saphesia is a monotypic genus of flowering plants belonging to the family Aizoaceae. Its only species is Saphesia flaccida.

It is endemic to the Cape Provinces of South Africa.
