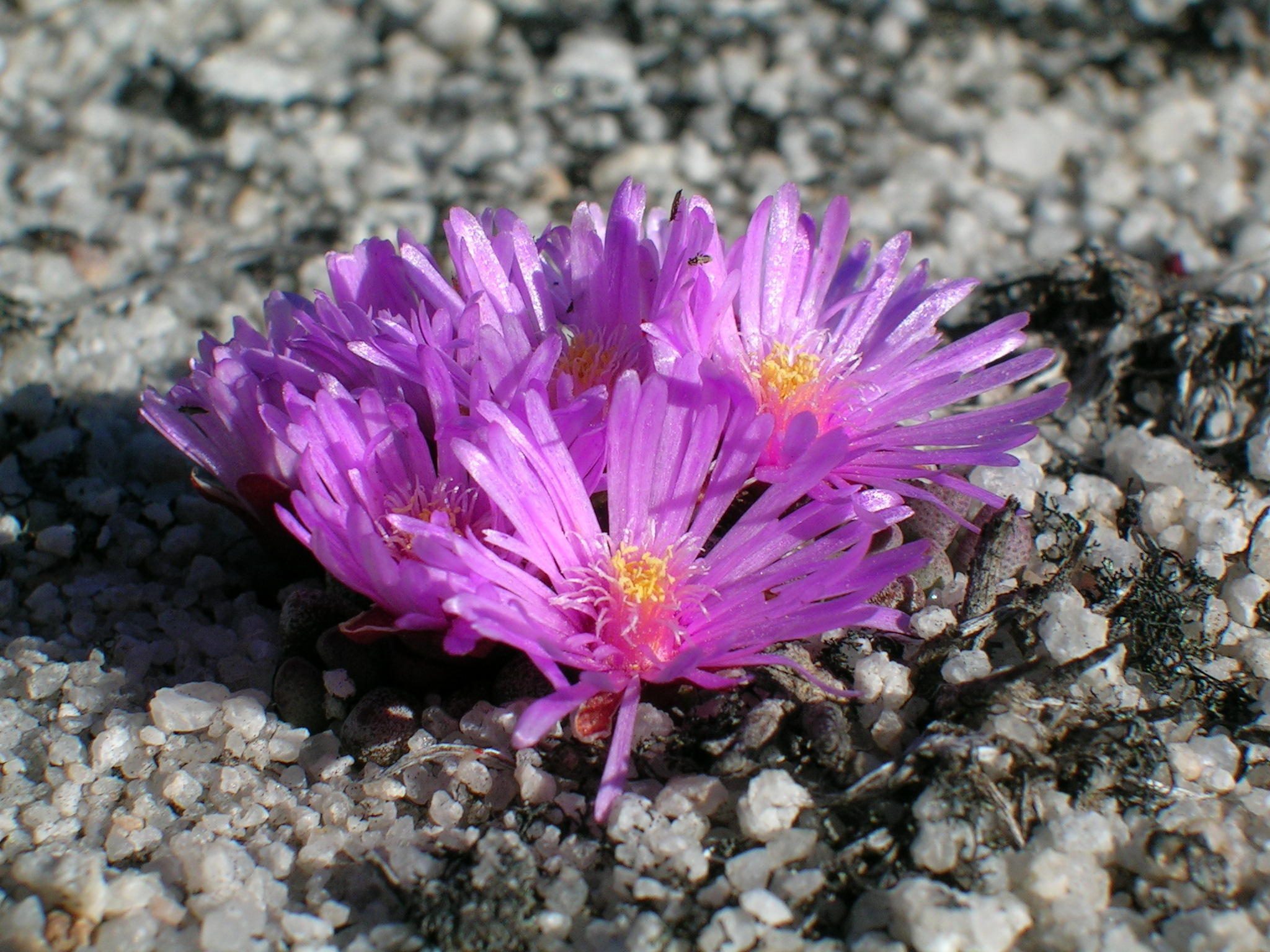
- Vlokia montana

Scientific classification
- Kingdom: Plantae
- Clade: Tracheophytes
- Clade: Angiosperms
- Clade: Eudicots
- Order: Caryophyllales
- Family: Aizoaceae
- Subfamily: Ruschioideae
- Tribe: Ruschieae
- Genus: Vlokia; S.A.Hammer

Species
- Vlokia ater S.A.Hammer; Vlokia montana Klak

= Vlokia =

Genus of succulents

Vlokia is a genus of flowering plants in the family Aizoaceae. It is endemic to the Cape Provinces of South Africa. The first description of the genus (along with the species Vlokia ater) was published in 1994 by Steven A. Hammer. The generic name honors the discoverer of Vlokia ater, South African botanist Jan H. J. Vlok (born 1957). The pronunciation "Flow-key-a" has been recommended based on the pronunciation of his name.

== Species ==
- Vlokia ater
- Vlokia montana
