= Neoalsomitra =

Scientific classification
- Kingdom: Plantae
- Clade: Embryophytes
- Clade: Tracheophytes
- Clade: Angiosperms
- Clade: Eudicots
- Clade: Rosids
- Order: Cucurbitales
- Family: Cucurbitaceae
- Genus: Neoalsomitra; Hutch.

Synonyms
- Alsomitra Benth. & Hook.f.

Genus of flowering plants

Neoalsomitra is a genus of flowering plants belonging to the squash family.

Its native range is Tropical and Subtropical Asia to Fiji.

== Species ==
Species:

- Neoalsomitra angustipetala (Craib) Hutch.
- Neoalsomitra balansae (Gagnep.) Hutch.
- Neoalsomitra capricornica (F.Muell.) Hutch.
- Neoalsomitra clavigera (Wall.) Hutch.
- Neoalsomitra hederifolia (Decne.) W.J.de Wilde & Duyfjes
- Neoalsomitra pilosa W.J.de Wilde & Duyfjes
- Neoalsomitra plena (Craib) Hutch.
- Neoalsomitra podagrica
- Neoalsomitra sarcophylla (Wall.) Hutch.
- Neoalsomitra schefferiana (Cogn.) Hutch.
- Neoalsomitra schultzei (Cogn.) Hutch.
- Neoalsomitra simplex (Craib) Hutch.
- Neoalsomitra trifoliolata (F.Muell.) Hutch.
