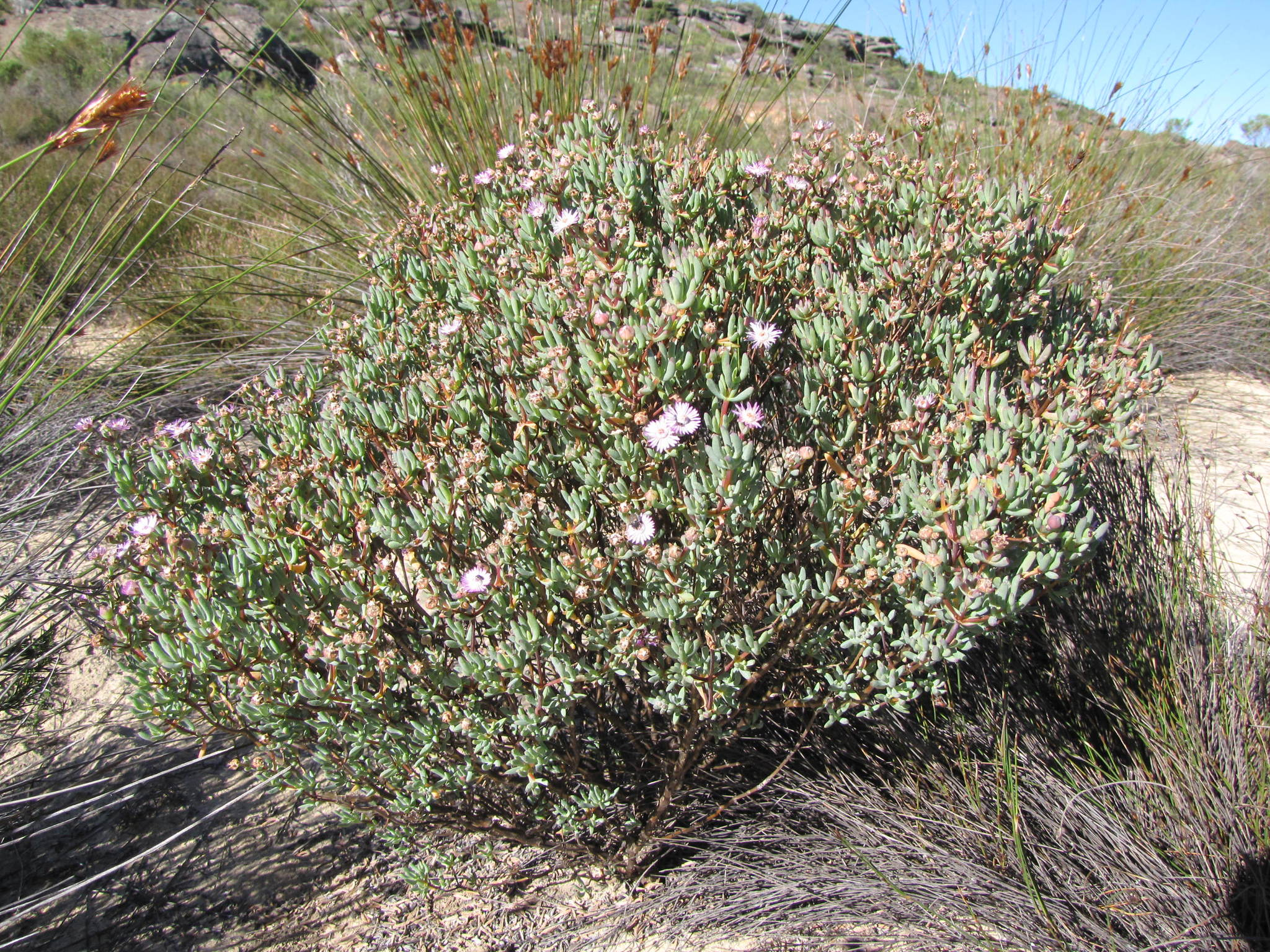
- Ruschiella lunulata

Scientific classification
- Kingdom: Plantae
- Clade: Tracheophytes
- Clade: Angiosperms
- Clade: Eudicots
- Order: Caryophyllales
- Family: Aizoaceae
- Genus: Ruschiella; Klak

= Ruschiella =

Genus of flowering plants

Ruschiella is a genus of flowering plants belonging to the family Aizoaceae.

Its native range is South African Republic.

== Species ==
Species:

- Ruschiella argentea (L.Bolus) Klak
- Ruschiella cedrimontana Klak
- Ruschiella henricii (L.Bolus) Klak
- Ruschiella lunulata (A.Berger) Klak
