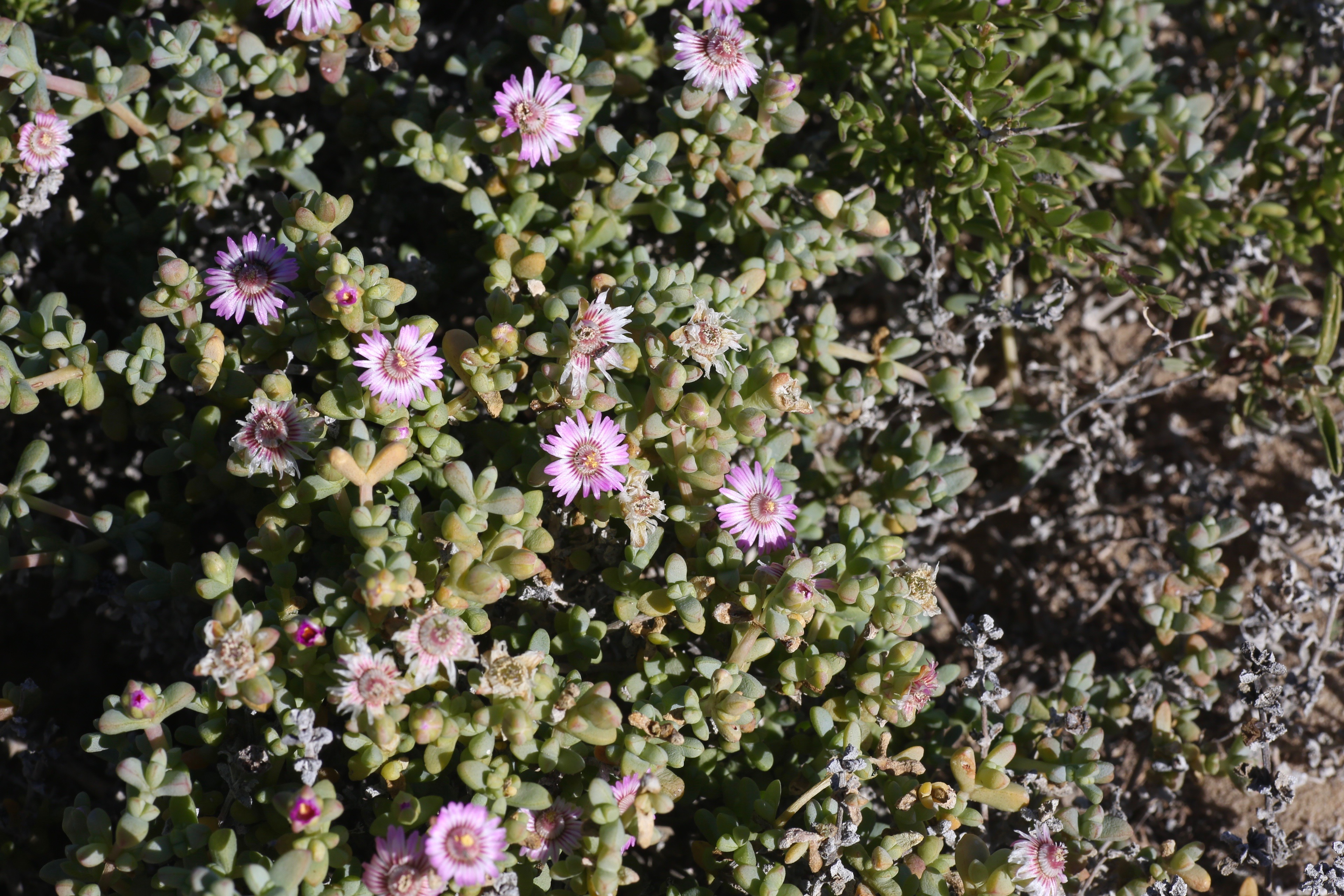

Scientific classification
- Kingdom: Plantae
- Clade: Tracheophytes
- Clade: Angiosperms
- Clade: Eudicots
- Order: Caryophyllales
- Family: Aizoaceae
- Subfamily: Ruschioideae
- Tribe: Ruschieae
- Genus: Amphibolia; L.Bolus ex Herre

= Amphibolia =

Genus of succulents

Amphibolia is a genus of plant in family Aizoaceae. It includes six species native to Namibia and the Cape Provinces of South Africa.

== Species ==
Six species are accepted.

- Amphibolia gydouwensis (L.Bolus) L.Bolus ex Toelken & Jessop
- Amphibolia laevis (Aiton) H.E.K.Hartmann
- Amphibolia obscura H.E.K.Hartmann
- Amphibolia rupis-arcuatae (Dinter) H.E.K.Hartmann
- Amphibolia saginata (L.Bolus) H.E.K.Hartmann
- Amphibolia succulenta (L.Bolus) H.E.K.Hartmann
