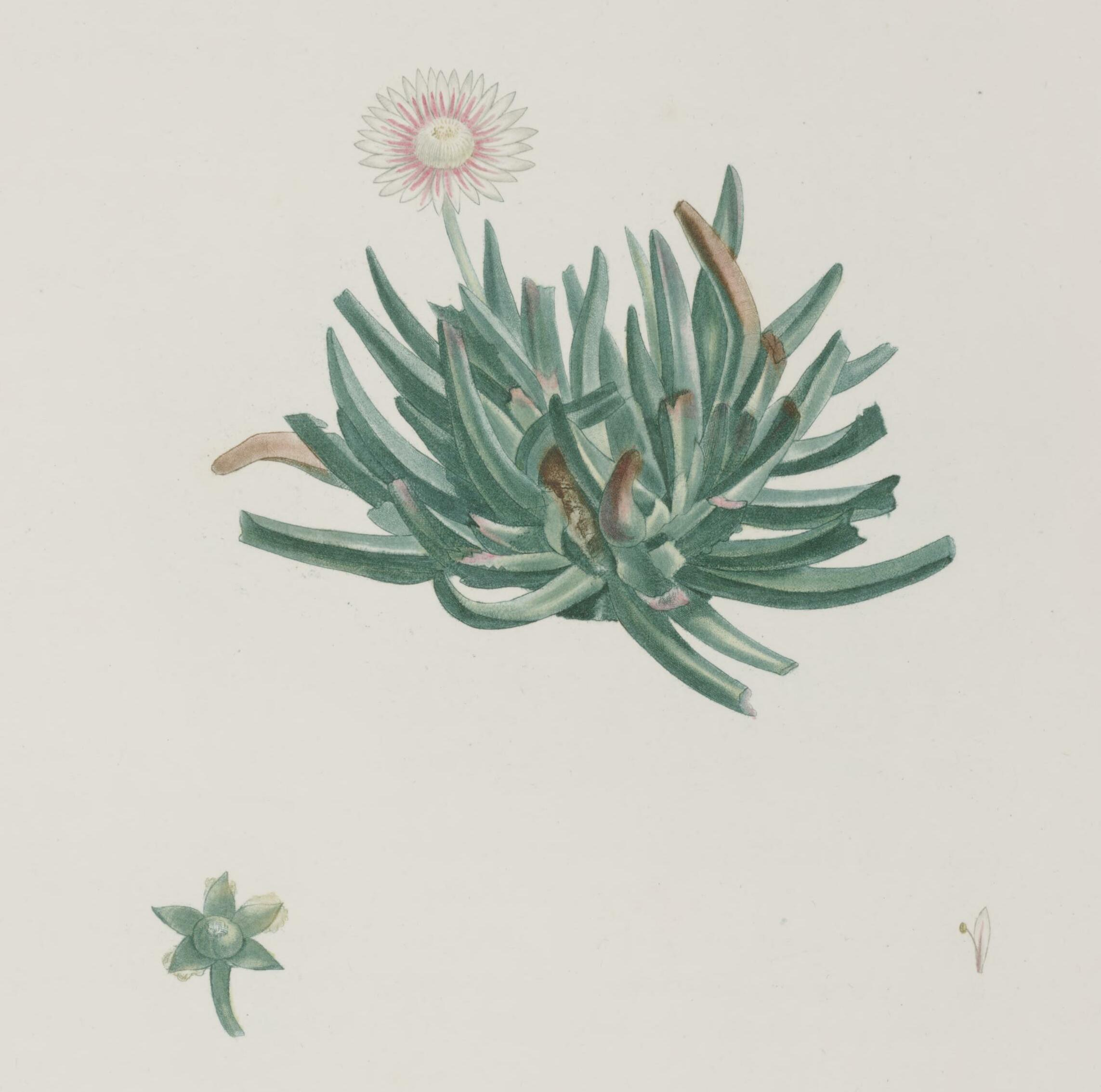
- Acrodon bellidiflorus, illustration from Plantarum historia succulentarum, 1802.

Scientific classification
- Kingdom: Plantae
- Clade: Tracheophytes
- Clade: Angiosperms
- Clade: Eudicots
- Order: Caryophyllales
- Family: Aizoaceae
- Subfamily: Ruschioideae
- Tribe: Ruschieae
- Genus: Acrodon; N.E.Br.

Type species
- Acrodon bellidiflorus (L.) N.E.Br.

= Acrodon =

Genus of succulents

Acrodon is a genus of ice plants from South Africa. It comprises five species, mostly endangered and all restricted to the southern Cape regions of the Western Cape and Eastern Cape Provinces, South Africa.

== Description ==
Species of Acrodon form dense, low mats or tufts of growth, and their leaves are triangular in cross-section.

Another distinctive feature is that the leaves and flowers have a few tiny teeth along the ends of their margins and keels.

The white or pink flowers often have striped petals. The fruits are solid and persistent, with five deep locules.

== History ==
Initially, Acrodon consisted of just one species - Acrodon bellidiflorus. A closer examination of Ruschia in 1986, however, found that several species shared traits with Acrodon bellidiflorus, resulting in them being moved to the genus Acrodon. Specifically, species in Acrodon had a more compact growth for while those in Ruschia formed shrubs, and Acrodon species had evenly spaced petals while Ruschia species had petals in five bundles.

A later examination of Acrodon, specifically of the fruits, however, found that Acrodon likely consists of at least two distinct genera - Acrodon and Brianhuntleya. The species of Acrodon species have funnel-shaped capsule base while those of Brianhuntleya have flat capsule bases. These two fruit types require different positionings and orientations on and of the stalk holding them.

== Species ==
The following species are recognised as of January 2023:

- Acrodon bellidiflorus (L.) N.E.Br. A common Renosterveld species that extends from Hermanus to Oudtshoorn.
- Acrodon caespitosus H.E.K.Hartmann (Synonyms: Acrodon duplessiae (Bolus) Glen)
- Acrodon deminutus Klak. A rarer species restricted to quartz-fields in the Eastern Rûens Shale Renosterveld and Potberg Ferricrete Fynbos vegetation types.
- Acrodon parvifolius R.du Plessis. An endangered species restricted to quartz and silcrete patches near to the coast, in the Botrivier area.
- Acrodon subulatus (Mill.) N.E.Br. An endangered species restricted to shale Renostervelds in the far western Overberg. (Synonymns: Acrodon leptophyllus (Bolus) Glen)

The following were previously included in Acrodon but have been moved to other genera:

- Acrodon purpureostylus (L.Bolus) Burgoyne - now Brianhuntleya purpureostyla (L.Bolus) H.E.K.Hartmann
- Acrodon quarcicola H.E.K.Hartmann - now Brianhuntleya quarcicola (H.E.K.Hartmann) H.E.K.Hartmann

== Relatives ==
This species has historically been confused with Ruschia. It is frequently confused with related genera that grow in the same region, such as Brianhuntleya or Cerochlamys.
