= Oscularia guthrieae =

Scientific classification
- Kingdom: Plantae
- Clade: Tracheophytes
- Clade: Angiosperms
- Clade: Eudicots
- Order: Caryophyllales
- Family: Aizoaceae
- Genus: Oscularia
- Species: O. guthrieae

Binomial name
- Oscularia guthrieae (L.Bolus) H.E.K.Hartmann

Synonyms
- Lampranthus guthrieae (L.Bolus) N.E.Br.; Mesembryanthemum guthrieae L.Bolus

Species of succulent

Oscularia guthrieae, also spelled as Oscularia guthriae, is a perennial flowering plant belonging to the genus Oscularia. The species is endemic to the Western Cape.
