= Ruschia leptocalyx =

Conservation status
- Least Concern (IUCN 3.1)

Scientific classification
- Kingdom: Plantae
- Clade: Tracheophytes
- Clade: Angiosperms
- Clade: Eudicots
- Order: Caryophyllales
- Family: Aizoaceae
- Genus: Ruschia
- Species: R. leptocalyx

Binomial name
- Ruschia leptocalyx L.Bolus

Species of succulent

Ruschia leptocalyx is a species of succulent plant in the family Aizoaceae. It is endemic to the Cape Provinces of South Africa, where its natural habitat is in rocky renosterveld vegetation in the southern Cape.

== Description ==
A slender branching shrub. The leaves are yellowish-gray, glabrous and sharply triangular in cross-section. The sharp leaf-keel is minutely serrated. leaves are circa 20mm long.

The flowers are purple-to-red, with pink stamens and staminodes at the centre. The flowers appear single or in small groups, and there are small bracteoles at the base of the flower stalks.

The seed capsule is gray, and 5-locular, with a base that is a tapering funnel shape.

== Distribution ==
This plant occurs in Renosterveld vegetation near Riversdale in the Overberg region, in the southern part of the Western Cape province, South Africa.
