= Oscularia comptonii =

Scientific classification
- Kingdom: Plantae
- Clade: Tracheophytes
- Clade: Angiosperms
- Clade: Eudicots
- Order: Caryophyllales
- Family: Aizoaceae
- Genus: Oscularia
- Species: O. comptonii

Binomial name
- Oscularia comptonii (L.Bolus) H.E.K.Hartmann

Synonyms
- Lampranthus comptonii (L.Bolus) N.E.Br.; Lampranthus ebracteatus L.Bolus; Mesembryanthemum comptonii L.Bolus

Species of succulent

Oscularia comptonii is a perennial flowering plant belonging to the genus Oscularia. The species is endemic to the Western Cape and occurs from the Koue Bokkeveld to the Olifants River. It has an area of 4947 km² and is part of the fynbos biome.
