= Acrodon subulatus =

Scientific classification
- Kingdom: Plantae
- Clade: Tracheophytes
- Clade: Angiosperms
- Clade: Eudicots
- Order: Caryophyllales
- Family: Aizoaceae
- Genus: Acrodon
- Species: A. subulatus

Binomial name
- Acrodon subulatus (Mill.) N.E.Br.

South African mesemb species

Acrodon subulatus, the Overberg tiptoothfig, is a species of mesemb from South Africa.

== Description ==
Acrodon subulatus is a compact perennial succulent. It lacks adventitious roots and has only a tap root. The internodes are not visible. The dark green leaves have a broad base and a pointed tip. The leaves are 35–70 mm (1.4–2.8 in) long and 3–5 mm (0.12–0.20 in)thick. The keel and margin may or may not have teeth, although the broad-based and flexible teeth are present more often than not.

Flowers are present between November and April. They are white or pale pink with purple margins and a purple central line. They have a diameter of about 25 mm (0.98 in). The stamens and filamentous staminodes form a dense central cone. The bracts reach less than halfway up the stem bearing a single flower. The fruits are borne on long, erect stalks. The closing body is lens-shaped and splits with pressure.

This species shares the traditional compact Acrodon growth form with Acrodon bellidiflorus and Acrodon caespitosus. It is the smallest and most compact of the three species and has the slenderest leaves.

== Distribution and habitat ==
This species is endemic to the Western Cape of South Africa, where it grows between Caledon and Stanford. It grows in Fynbos and Renosterveld areas on gravelly open patches that are shaded at times. This is a winter rainfall area.

== Etymology ==
The species name (subulatus) refers to the way that the leaves taper from a broad base to a pointed tip.

== Conservation ==
Acrodon subulatus is considered to be endangered by the South African National Biodiversity Institute. When the species was assessed in 2006, it was found that there were fewer than 270 mature individuals across five small (20-100 mature individuals) subpopulations. The species has an extent of occurrence of under 2,000 km^{2} (770 sq mi) and over 80 percent of this land has already been lost due to agriculture. The species is also threatened by spreading invasive species, such as shrubs and grasses.
