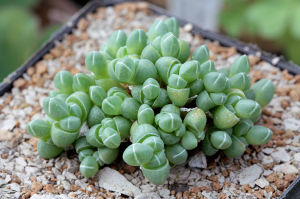
- Antimima evoluta

Scientific classification
- Kingdom: Plantae
- Clade: Tracheophytes
- Clade: Angiosperms
- Clade: Eudicots
- Order: Caryophyllales
- Family: Aizoaceae
- Subfamily: Ruschioideae
- Tribe: Ruschieae
- Genus: Antimima; N.E.Br.

Synonyms
- Mossia R.Br.

= Antimima =

Genus of succulents

Antimima is a genus of succulent plants in the family Aizoaceae. It includes 106 species native to Namibia and the Cape Provinces and Free State of South Africa.

== Description ==
The Greek word "antimimos" means "imitating", and refers to the similarity some species have to the different genus Argyroderma.

The species of this varied genus typically grow as dense cushions or mats. Otherwise, Antimima species are very similar in their superficial looks to the related genus Ruschia, with 3-sided waxy succulent leaves, and pink or white flowers.

== Species ==
Plants of the World Online accepts 106 species.

- Antimima addita (L.Bolus) H.E.K.Hartmann
- Antimima alborubra (L.Bolus) Dehn
- Antimima amoena (Schwantes) H.E.K.Hartmann
- Antimima androsacea (Marloth & Schwantes) H.E.K.Hartmann
- Antimima argentea (L.Bolus) H.E.K.Hartmann
- Antimima aurasensis H.E.K.Hartmann
- Antimima biformis (N.E.Br.) H.E.K.Hartmann
- Antimima bracteata (L.Bolus) H.E.K.Hartmann
- Antimima brevicarpa (L.Bolus) H.E.K.Hartmann
- Antimima brevicollis (N.E.Br.) H.E.K.Hartmann
- Antimima buchubergensis (Dinter) H.E.K.Hartmann
- Antimima compacta (L.Bolus) H.E.K.Hartmann
- Antimima compressa (L.Bolus) H.E.K.Hartmann
- Antimima concinna (L.Bolus) H.E.K.Hartmann
- Antimima condensa (N.E.Br.) H.E.K.Hartmann
- Antimima dasyphylla (Schltr.) H.E.K.Hartmann
- Antimima defecta (L.Bolus) H.E.K.Hartmann
- Antimima dekenahi (N.E.Br.) H.E.K.Hartmann
- Antimima distans (L.Bolus) H.E.K.Hartmann
- Antimima dolomitica (Dinter) H.E.K.Hartmann
- Antimima dualis (N.E.Br.) N.E.Br.
- Antimima eendornensis (Dinter) H.E.K.Hartmann
- Antimima elevata (L.Bolus) H.E.K.Hartmann
- Antimima emarcescens (L.Bolus) H.E.K.Hartmann
- Antimima erosa (L.Bolus) H.E.K.Hartmann
- Antimima evoluta (N.E.Br.) H.E.K.Hartmann
- Antimima excedens (L.Bolus) Klak
- Antimima exsurgens (L.Bolus) H.E.K.Hartmann
- Antimima fenestrata (L.Bolus) H.E.K.Hartmann
- Antimima fergusoniae (L.Bolus) H.E.K.Hartmann
- Antimima gracillima (L.Bolus) H.E.K.Hartmann
- Antimima granitica (L.Bolus) H.E.K.Hartmann
- Antimima hallii (L.Bolus) H.E.K.Hartmann
- Antimima hamatilis (L.Bolus) H.E.K.Hartmann
- Antimima hantamensis (Engl.) H.E.K.Hartmann & Stüber
- Antimima herrei (Schwantes) H.E.K.Hartmann
- Antimima insidens (L.Bolus) Chess.
- Antimima intervallaris (L.Bolus) H.E.K.Hartmann
- Antimima ivori (N.E.Br.) H.E.K.Hartmann
- Antimima karroidea (L.Bolus) H.E.K.Hartmann
- Antimima klaverensis (L.Bolus) H.E.K.Hartmann
- Antimima koekenaapensis (L.Bolus) H.E.K.Hartmann
- Antimima komkansica (L.Bolus) H.E.K.Hartmann
- Antimima lawsonii (L.Bolus) H.E.K.Hartmann
- Antimima leipoldtii (L.Bolus) H.E.K.Hartmann
- Antimima leucanthera (L.Bolus) H.E.K.Hartmann
- Antimima levynsiae (L.Bolus) S.A.Hammer
- Antimima limbata (N.E.Br.) H.E.K.Hartmann
- Antimima lodewykii (L.Bolus) H.E.K.Hartmann
- Antimima loganii (L.Bolus) H.E.K.Hartmann
- Antimima lokenbergensis (L.Bolus) H.E.K.Hartmann
- Antimima longipes (L.Bolus) Dehn
- Antimima luckhoffii (L.Bolus) H.E.K.Hartmann
- Antimima maleolens (L.Bolus) H.E.K.Hartmann
- Antimima maxwellii (L.Bolus) H.E.K.Hartmann
- Antimima menniei (L.Bolus) H.E.K.Hartmann
- Antimima mesklipensis (L.Bolus) H.E.K.Hartmann
- Antimima meyerae H.E.K.Hartmann
- Antimima microphylla (Haw.) Dehn
- Antimima minima (Tischer) H.E.K.Hartmann
- Antimima minutifolia (L.Bolus) H.E.K.Hartmann
- Antimima modesta (L.Bolus) H.E.K.Hartmann
- Antimima mucronata (Haw.) H.E.K.Hartmann
- Antimima mutica (L.Bolus) H.E.K.Hartmann
- Antimima nobilis (Schwantes) H.E.K.Hartmann
- Antimima nordenstamii (L.Bolus) H.E.K.Hartmann
- Antimima oviformis (L.Bolus) H.E.K.Hartmann
- Antimima papillata (L.Bolus) H.E.K.Hartmann
- Antimima paripetala (L.Bolus) Klak
- Antimima paucifolia (L.Bolus) H.E.K.Hartmann
- Antimima pauper (L.Bolus) H.E.K.Hartmann
- Antimima peersii (L.Bolus) H.E.K.Hartmann
- Antimima perforata (L.Bolus) H.E.K.Hartmann
- Antimima persistens H.E.K.Hartmann
- Antimima pilosula (L.Bolus) H.E.K.Hartmann
- Antimima piscodora (L.Bolus) H.E.K.Hartmann
- Antimima prolongata (L.Bolus) H.E.K.Hartmann
- Antimima propinqua (N.E.Br.) H.E.K.Hartmann
- Antimima prostrata (L.Bolus) H.E.K.Hartmann
- Antimima pulchella (Haw.) H.E.K.Hartmann
- Antimima pumila (L.Bolus ex Fedde & C.Schust.) H.E.K.Hartmann (syn. Ruschia pumila)
- Antimima pusilla (Schwantes) H.E.K.Hartmann
- Antimima pygmaea (Haw.) H.E.K.Hartmann
- Antimima quartzitica (Dinter) H.E.K.Hartmann
- Antimima radicans (L.Bolus) Klak
- Antimima roseola (N.E.Br.) H.E.K.Hartmann
- Antimima rostella (Haw.) H.E.K.Hartmann
- Antimima saturata (L.Bolus) H.E.K.Hartmann
- Antimima saxicola (L.Bolus) H.E.K.Hartmann
- Antimima schlechteri (Schwantes) H.E.K.Hartmann
- Antimima simulans (L.Bolus) H.E.K.Hartmann
- Antimima sobrina (N.E.Br.) H.E.K.Hartmann
- Antimima solida (L.Bolus) H.E.K.Hartmann
- Antimima stayneri (L.Bolus) H.E.K.Hartmann
- Antimima stokoei (L.Bolus) H.E.K.Hartmann
- Antimima subtruncata (L.Bolus) H.E.K.Hartmann
- Antimima triquetra (L.Bolus) H.E.K.Hartmann
- Antimima tuberculosa (L.Bolus) H.E.K.Hartmann
- Antimima turneriana (L.Bolus) H.E.K.Hartmann
- Antimima vanzylii (L.Bolus) H.E.K.Hartmann
- Antimima varians (L.Bolus) H.E.K.Hartmann
- Antimima ventricosa (L.Bolus) H.E.K.Hartmann
- Antimima verruculosa (L.Bolus) H.E.K.Hartmann
- Antimima viatorum (L.Bolus) Klak
- Antimima watermeyeri (L.Bolus) H.E.K.Hartmann
- Antimima wittebergensis (L.Bolus) H.E.K.Hartmann
