= Oscularia primiverna =

Scientific classification
- Kingdom: Plantae
- Clade: Tracheophytes
- Clade: Angiosperms
- Clade: Eudicots
- Order: Caryophyllales
- Family: Aizoaceae
- Genus: Oscularia
- Species: O. primiverna

Binomial name
- Oscularia primiverna (L.Bolus) H.E.K.Hartmann

Synonyms
- Lampranthus primivernus (L.Bolus) L.Bolus; Mesembryanthemum primivernum L.Bolus

Species of succulent

Oscularia primiverna is a perennial flowering plant belonging to the genus Oscularia. The species is endemic to the Western Cape.
