= Oscularia vredenburgensis =

Scientific classification
- Kingdom: Plantae
- Clade: Tracheophytes
- Clade: Angiosperms
- Clade: Eudicots
- Order: Caryophyllales
- Family: Aizoaceae
- Genus: Oscularia
- Species: O. vredenburgensis

Binomial name
- Oscularia vredenburgensis (L.Bolus) H.E.K.Hartmann

Synonyms
- Lampranthus vredenburgensis L.Bolus

Species of succulent

Oscularia vredenburgensis is a perennial flowering plant belonging to the genus Oscularia. The species is endemic to the Western Cape and occurs from Stompneus Bay to Langebaan where it is part of the strandveld biome. The plant has a range of less than 500 km² and its habitat has decreased by 30% in the past 15 years. There are currently five known subpopulations. The plant is threatened by coastal development and overgrazing.
