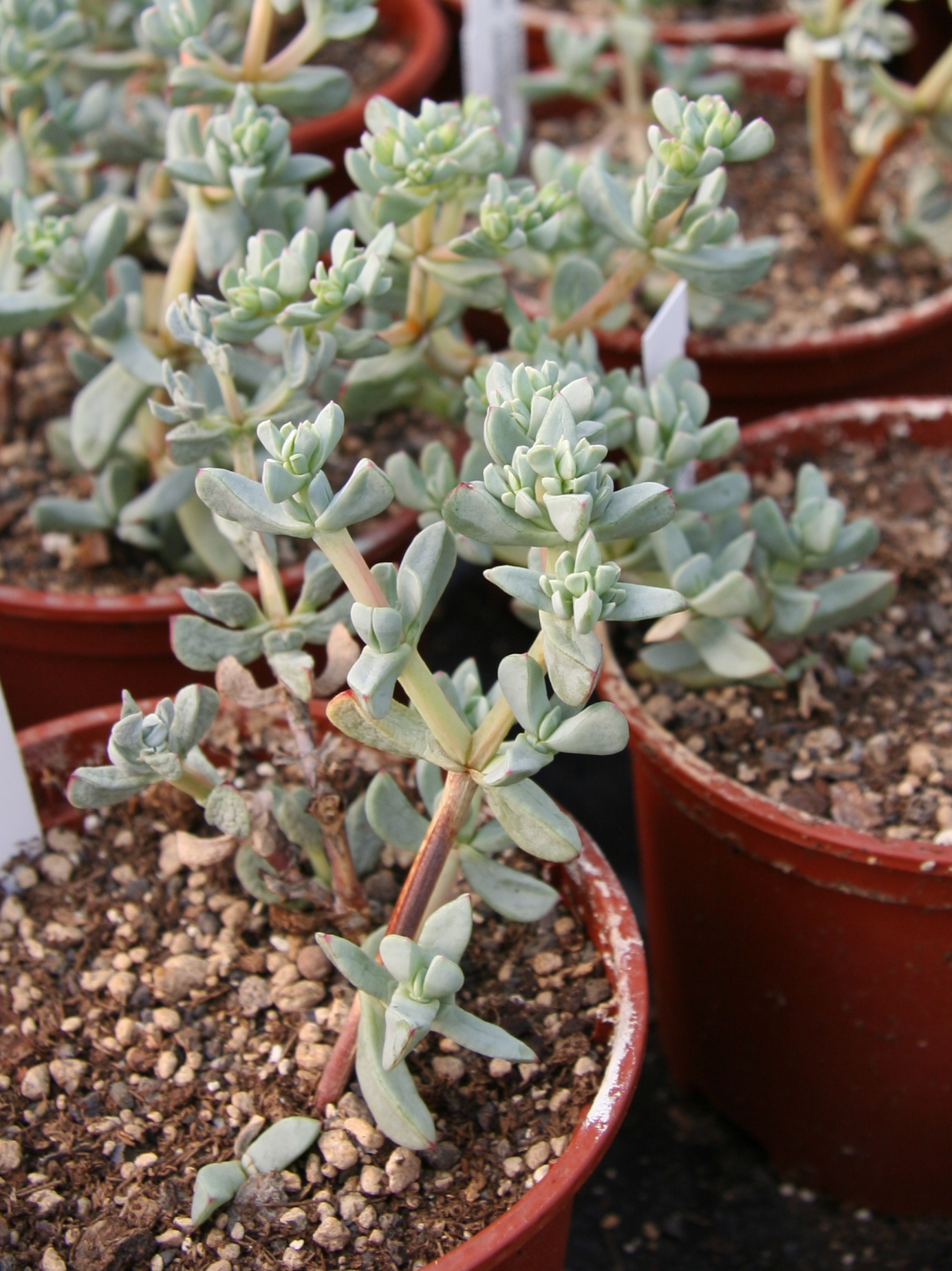

Scientific classification
- Kingdom: Plantae
- Clade: Tracheophytes
- Clade: Angiosperms
- Clade: Eudicots
- Order: Caryophyllales
- Family: Aizoaceae
- Genus: Oscularia
- Species: O. piquetbergensis

Binomial name
- Oscularia piquetbergensis (L.Bolus) H.E.K.Hartmann

Synonyms
- Lampranthus piquetbergensis (L.Bolus) L.Bolus; Mesembryanthemum piquetbergense L.Bolus

= Oscularia piquetbergensis =

Species of succulent

Oscularia piquetbergensis is a perennial flowering plant belonging to the genus Oscularia. The species is endemic to the Western Cape.
