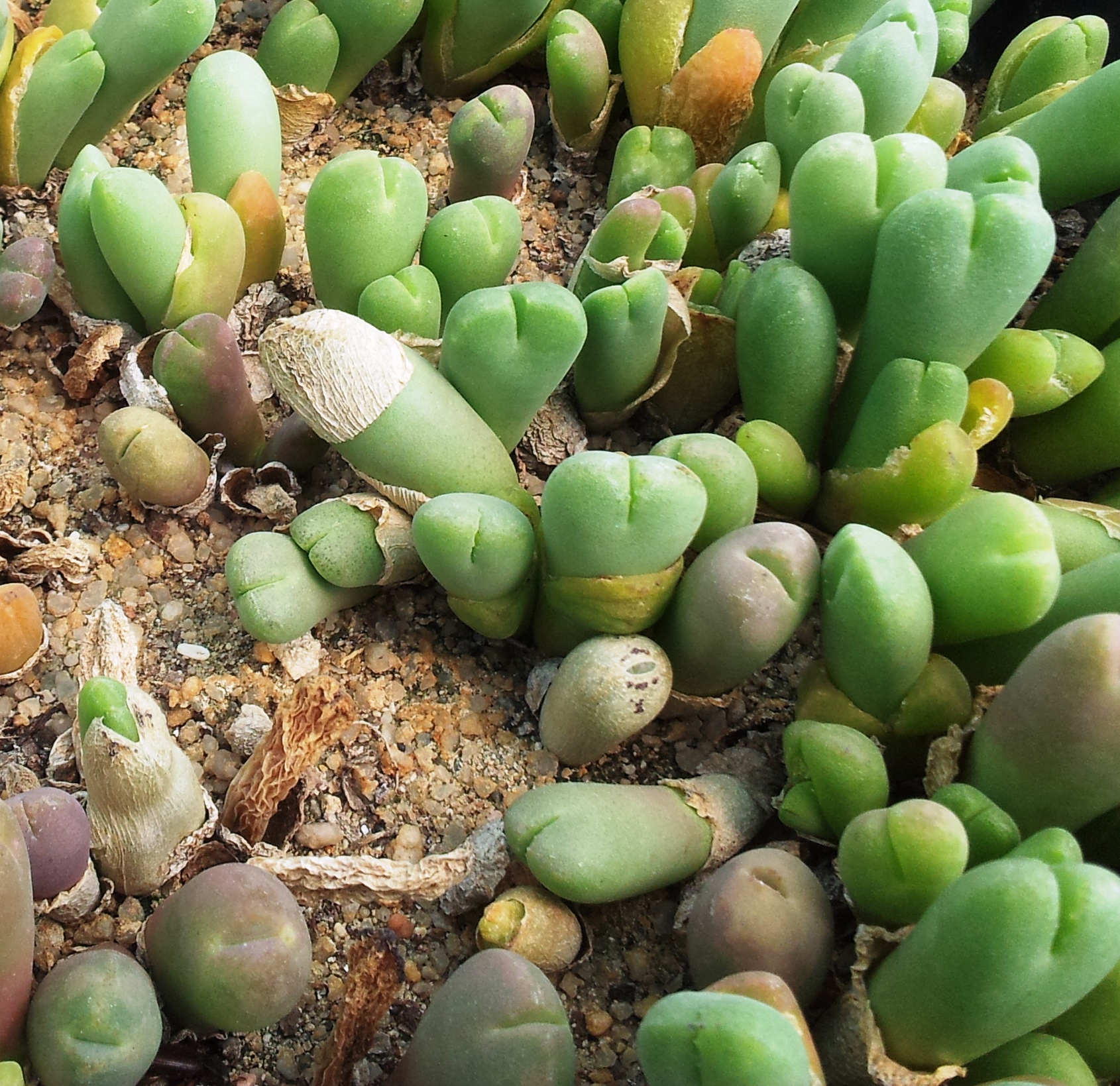
- Vanheerdea roodiae

Scientific classification
- Kingdom: Plantae
- Clade: Tracheophytes
- Clade: Angiosperms
- Clade: Eudicots
- Order: Caryophyllales
- Family: Aizoaceae
- Subfamily: Ruschioideae
- Tribe: Ruschieae
- Genus: Vanheerdea; L.Bolus ex H.E.K.Hartmann

Synonyms
- Vanheerdia L.Bolus

= Vanheerdea =

Genus of flowering plants

Vanheerdea is a genus of flowering plants belonging to the family Aizoaceae. It is also in Tribe Ruschieae.

It is native to the Cape Provinces of the South African Republic.

== Known species ==
As accepted by Kew:

- Vanheerdea divergens (L.Bolus) L.Bolus ex S.A.Hammer
- Vanheerdea primosii (L.Bolus) L.Bolus ex H.E.K.Hartmann
- Vanheerdea roodiae (N.E.Br.) L.Bolus ex H.E.K.Hartmann

The genus name of Vanheerdea is in honour of Pieter van Heerde (1893–1979), a South African teacher and plant collector. It was first described and published in Bradleya Vol.10 on page 15 in 1992.
