= Antimima eendornensis =

Conservation status
- Vulnerable (IUCN 3.1)

Scientific classification
- Kingdom: Plantae
- Clade: Tracheophytes
- Clade: Angiosperms
- Clade: Eudicots
- Order: Caryophyllales
- Family: Aizoaceae
- Genus: Antimima
- Species: A. eendornensis

Binomial name
- Antimima eendornensis (Dinter) H.E.K.Hartmann

Synonyms
- Mesembryanthemum eendornense Dinter

Species of succulent

Antimima eendornensis is a species of plant in the family Aizoaceae. It is endemic to Namibia. Its natural habitats are subtropical or tropical dry shrubland and rocky areas. It is threatened by habitat loss.
