= Ruschia namusmontana =

Conservation status
- Least Concern (IUCN 3.1)

Scientific classification
- Kingdom: Plantae
- Clade: Tracheophytes
- Clade: Angiosperms
- Clade: Eudicots
- Order: Caryophyllales
- Family: Aizoaceae
- Genus: Ruschia
- Species: R. namusmontana

Binomial name
- Ruschia namusmontana Friedrich

Species of succulent

Ruschia namusmontana is a species of plant in the family Aizoaceae. It is endemic to Namibia. Its natural habitats are rocky areas and cold desert.
