= Rhombophyllum dyeri =

Scientific classification
- Kingdom: Plantae
- Clade: Tracheophytes
- Clade: Angiosperms
- Clade: Eudicots
- Order: Caryophyllales
- Family: Aizoaceae
- Genus: Rhombophyllum
- Species: R. dyeri

Binomial name
- Rhombophyllum dyeri (L.Bolus) H.E.K.Hartmann

Synonyms
- Hereroa dyeri L.Bolus

Species of plant

Rhombophyllum dyeri is a succulent plant in the Aizoaceae family. The species is endemic to South Africa and occurs in the Eastern Cape.
