= Oscularia ornata =

Scientific classification
- Kingdom: Plantae
- Clade: Tracheophytes
- Clade: Angiosperms
- Clade: Eudicots
- Order: Caryophyllales
- Family: Aizoaceae
- Genus: Oscularia
- Species: O. ornata

Binomial name
- Oscularia ornata (L.Bolus) H.E.K.Hartmann

Synonyms
- Lampranthus ornatus L.Bolus

Species of succulent

Oscularia ornata is a perennial flowering plant belonging to the genus Oscularia. The species is endemic to the Western Cape.
