= Vanheerdea primosii =

Scientific classification
- Kingdom: Plantae
- Clade: Tracheophytes
- Clade: Angiosperms
- Clade: Eudicots
- Order: Caryophyllales
- Family: Aizoaceae
- Genus: Vanheerdea
- Species: V. primosii

Binomial name
- Vanheerdea primosii (L.Bolus) L.Bolus ex H.E.K.Hartmann

Synonyms
- Rimaria primosii L.Bolus; Vanheerdia primosii (L.Bolus) L.Bolus

Species of succulent

Vanheerdea primosii is a small succulent plant that is part of the Aizoaceae family. The species is endemic to South Africa and occurs in the Northern Cape.
