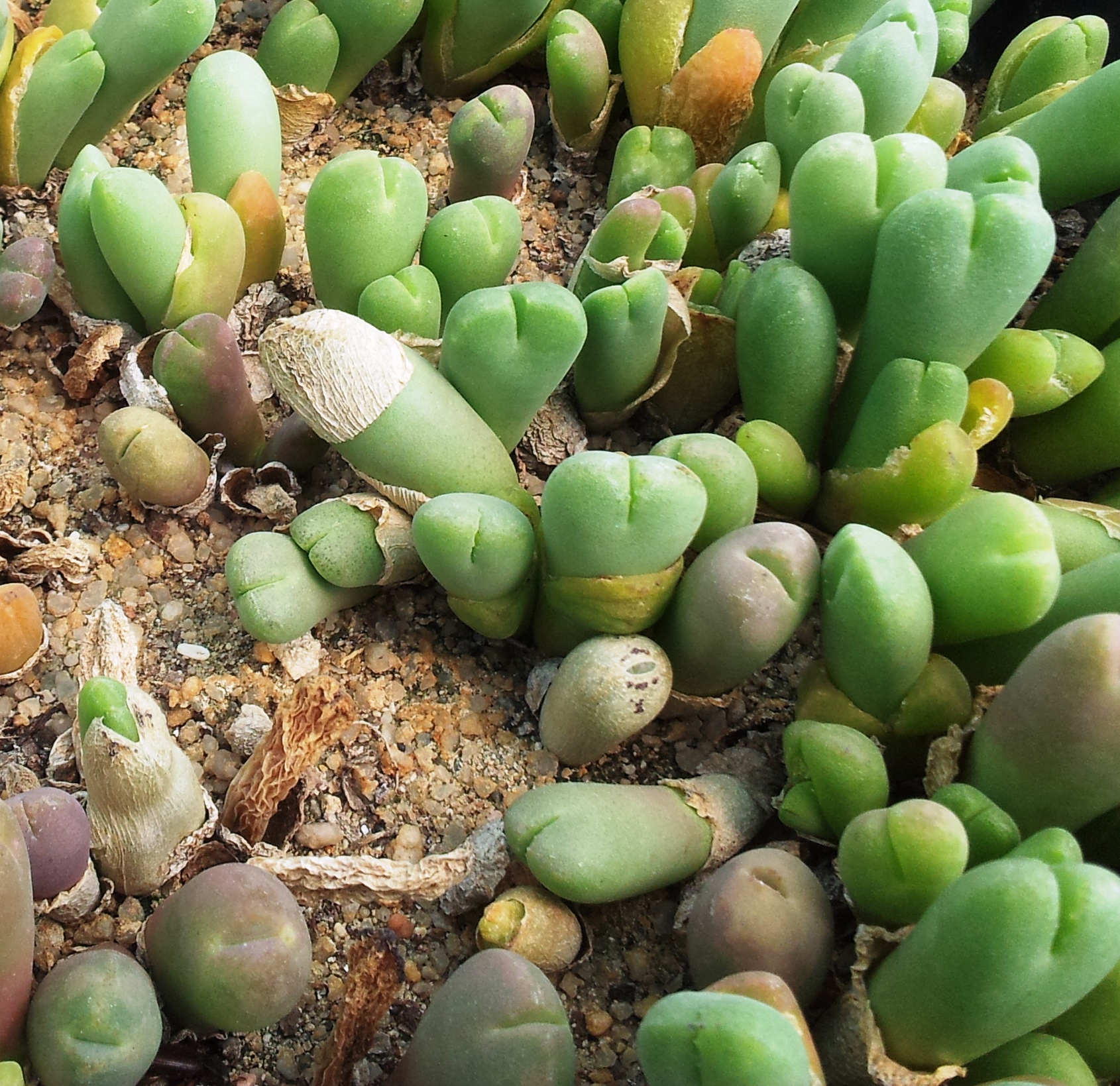

Scientific classification
- Kingdom: Plantae
- Clade: Tracheophytes
- Clade: Angiosperms
- Clade: Eudicots
- Order: Caryophyllales
- Family: Aizoaceae
- Genus: Vanheerdea
- Species: V. roodiae

Binomial name
- Vanheerdea roodiae (N.E.Br.) L.Bolus ex H.E.K.Hartmann

Synonyms
- Rimaria angusta L.Bolus; Rimaria roodiae N.E.Br.; Vanheerdia angusta (L.Bolus) L.Bolus; Vanheerdia roodiae (N.E.Br.) L.Bolus

= Vanheerdea roodiae =

Species of succulent

Vanheerdea roodiae is a small succulent plant that is part of the Aizoaceae family. The species is endemic to South Africa and occurs in the Northern Cape.
