= Acrodon caespitosus =

Scientific classification
- Kingdom: Plantae
- Clade: Tracheophytes
- Clade: Angiosperms
- Clade: Eudicots
- Order: Caryophyllales
- Family: Aizoaceae
- Genus: Acrodon
- Species: A. caespitosus

Binomial name
- Acrodon caespitosus H.E.K.Hartmann

South African mesemb species

Acrodon caespitosus, the Potberg tiptoothfig, is a species of mesemb from South Africa.

== Description ==
This succulent plant forms big and low cushion-shaped shrubs. It is the biggest species in the genus, growing up to a height of 30 cm (0.98 ft) with a diameter of 60 cm (2.0 ft). It has only a tap root, with no adventitious roots. The internodes are long, orange-yellow and spongy and have two prominent lateral folds. The triangular leaves are a deep green in colour, and are about 50 mm (2.0 in) long and 5–9 mm (0.20–0.35 in) broad and thick. Like with the plant, these are the biggest in the genus. There are three to twelve teeth on the keel and no teeth (or sometimes between one and three teeth) on the leaf margins. The leaf sheaths are persistent and turn black with age.

Solitary flowers are borne on stems. The bracteoles reach the calyx and embrace the base of the flower. The calyx lobes are longer than the petals in younger flowers. The flower has a short cone morphology, similar to those of Acrodon bellidiflorus and Acrodon subulatus. The central cone has about 300 stamens with few or no filamentous staminodes. They have long basal papillae that point inwards and interweave to form a felt-like layer. The 45-55 petals are white or pink with a purple stripe and purple margins.

The fruits are borne above the plant on 85 mm (3.3 in) stalks. The stalks bend upwards, allowing them to receive rainwater when they are open. The capsule, with a height and diameter of about 12 mm (0.47 in) and a top of 5 mm (0.20 in), is the largest of the genus. The lens-shaped closing body splits with pressure. While the long stem holding the fruit may sway due to the pressure from raindrops, wind dispersal is unlikely as the seeds stick together when wet. The capsule closes again when dry, reopening upon the next rain event.

== Distribution and habitat ==
Acrodon caespitosus is endemic to the Western Cape of South Africa. It grows near the mouth of the Breede River, near Swellendam. This area consists of shrubby coastal fynbos that receives rain all year round. It grows on limestone or in sandy patches.

== Conservation ==
While the risk of extinction for this species has not officially been assessed, it is known that the species living in its habitat are threatened by invasive species, including Acacia cyclops and Acacia longifolia.
