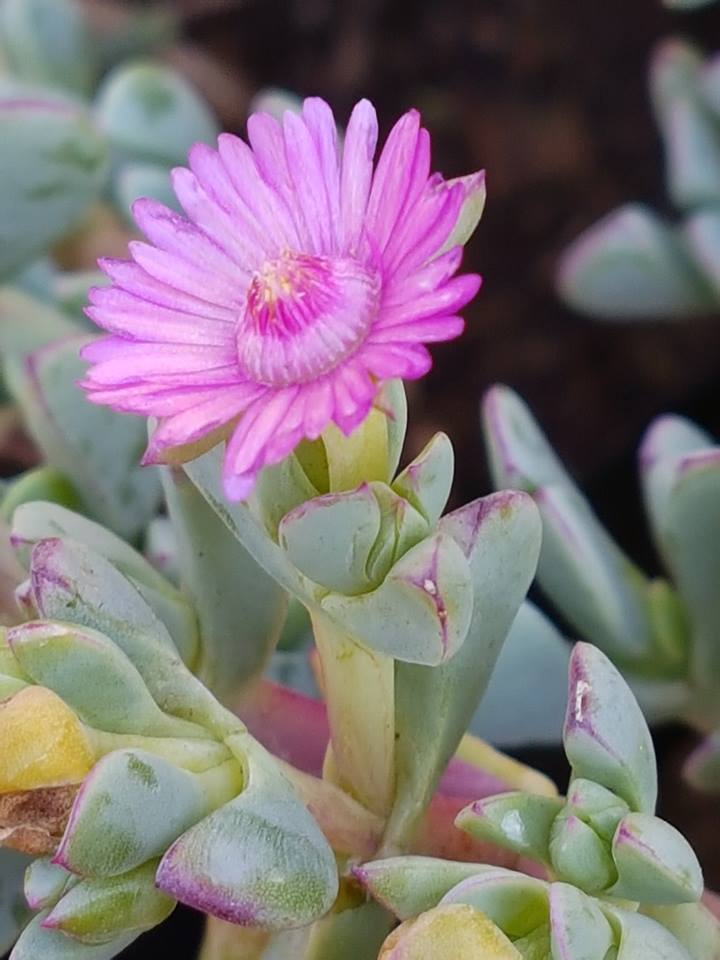

Scientific classification
- Kingdom: Plantae
- Clade: Tracheophytes
- Clade: Angiosperms
- Clade: Eudicots
- Order: Caryophyllales
- Family: Aizoaceae
- Genus: Oscularia
- Species: O. cedarbergensis

Binomial name
- Oscularia cedarbergensis (L.Bolus) H.E.K.Hartmann

Synonyms
- Lampranthus cedarbergensis (L.Bolus) L.Bolus; Mesembryanthemum cedarbergense L.Bolus

= Oscularia cedarbergensis =

Species of succulent

Oscularia cedarbergensis, commonly known as the Cederberg toothfig or vyebos, is a perennial flowering plant belonging to the genus Oscularia. The species is endemic to the Western Cape.
