= Antimima buchubergensis =

Conservation status
- Least Concern (IUCN 3.1)

Scientific classification
- Kingdom: Plantae
- Clade: Tracheophytes
- Clade: Angiosperms
- Clade: Eudicots
- Order: Caryophyllales
- Family: Aizoaceae
- Genus: Antimima
- Species: A. buchubergensis

Binomial name
- Antimima buchubergensis (Dinter) H.E.K.Hartmann

Species of succulent

Antimima buchubergensis is a species of plant in the family Aizoaceae. It is endemic to Namibia. Its natural habitats are subtropical or tropical dry shrubland and rocky areas.
