= Oscularia lunata =

Conservation status
- Least Concern (SANBI Red List)

Scientific classification
- Kingdom: Plantae
- Clade: Tracheophytes
- Clade: Angiosperms
- Clade: Eudicots
- Order: Caryophyllales
- Family: Aizoaceae
- Genus: Oscularia
- Species: O. lunata

Binomial name
- Oscularia lunata (Willd.) H.E.K.Hartmann

Synonyms
- Lampranthus lunatus (Willd.) N.E.Br.; Mesembryanthemum lunatum Willd.

Species of succulent flowering plant endemic to the Fybos region

Oscularia lunata is a species of succulent flowering plant in the genus Oscularia. It is endemic to the Fynbos region in the Western Cape.
