= Acrodon parvifolius =

Scientific classification
- Kingdom: Plantae
- Clade: Tracheophytes
- Clade: Angiosperms
- Clade: Eudicots
- Order: Caryophyllales
- Family: Aizoaceae
- Genus: Acrodon
- Species: A. parvifolius

Binomial name
- Acrodon parvifolius du Plessis

South African mesemb species

Acrodon parvifolius, the Botriver tiptoothfig, is a species of mesemb from South Africa. This species, which grows close to the ground, can best be recognised by its small, thin leaves and its flowers, which form a dome in the middle.

== Description ==
This succulent has long, trailing branches that form dense mats on the ground. It has a tap root and only rarely has adventitious roots. The woody grey internodes are circular and have a length of 6–15 mm (0.24–0.59 in). The triangular leaves are a yellowish green or a darker green in colour, becoming a lighter yellowish green at the base. The tips may be purple. They are up to 20 mm (0.79 in) long and are thin (3–4 mm (0.12–0.16 in) wide and thick). This species has the fewest teeth in its genus, with leaves fruqently having smooth margins and only a single tooth on the keel. The keel may, however, have up to four flexible, broad-based teeth.

Flowers are present in August and September. Single flowers with a diameter if about 20 mm (0.79 in) are borne on the ends of branches and are embraced vythe bracte the sroound their stems. They are white or pink in colour and have a purple line and purple margins. There are many purple filamentous staminodes that form a dome in the center of each flower. They turn upwards towards their tips, which curl with age. The bases have white papillae that interweave to form a white, felt-like layer. Pink stamens are borne on rich pink filaments in the center of the flower.

Solitary fruits are borne on the ends of short, stiff stems. These capsules are about 20 mm (0.79 in) long and 8 mm (0.31 in) wide. The valve rims (less than a third of the height of the locule) are some of the lowest in the genus. The closing bodies are broader than those in other species in this genus and do not spilt with pressure. The seeds are arranged in rows and are about 1.1 mm (0.043 in) long and 0.8 mm (0.031 in) wide.

== Distribution and habitat ==
This species is endemic to the Western Cape of South Africa. It gorws on clay soils around Hermarnus, particularly around riverbeds, and is also known from the edges of roads and shale remenents around Calendon and Botrivier. It grows near the sea in winter rainfall areas. It has an area of occuerence of less than 154 km^{2} (59 sq mi).

== Etymology ==
The species name (parvifolius) refers to the small leaves of the plants.

== Conservation ==
With only six small and highly fragmented subpopulations remaining, the South African National Biodiversity Institute has classified Acrodon parvifolius as endangered. Much of its habitat has already been transformed as a consequence of urban development, farming, alien species and, road construction and maintenance. These threats continue to grow and the species habitat continues to decline.
