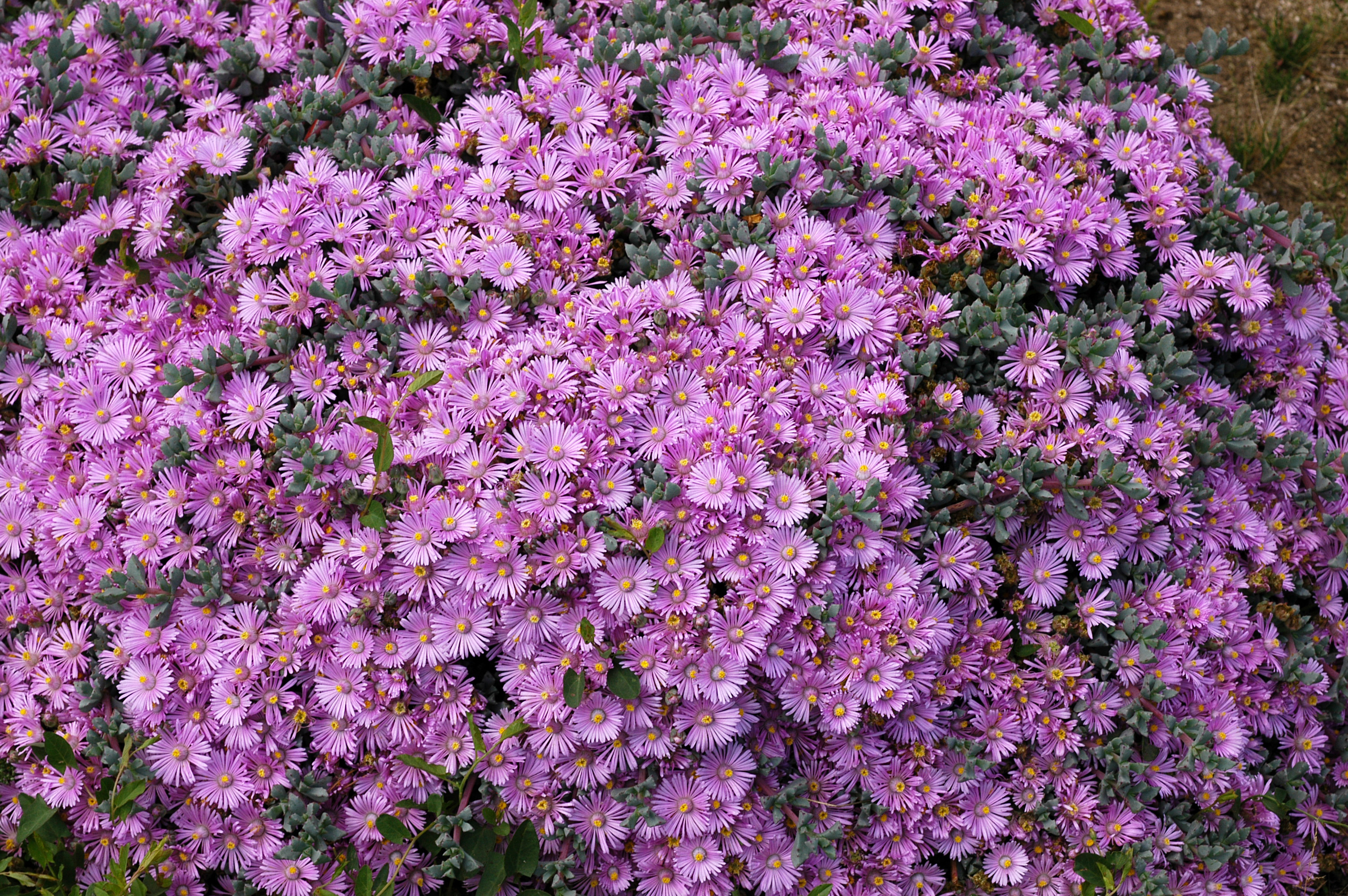

Scientific classification
- Kingdom: Plantae
- Clade: Tracheophytes
- Clade: Angiosperms
- Clade: Eudicots
- Order: Caryophyllales
- Family: Aizoaceae
- Genus: Oscularia
- Species: O. deltoides

Binomial name
- Oscularia deltoides Schwantes

= Oscularia deltoides =

Species of succulent

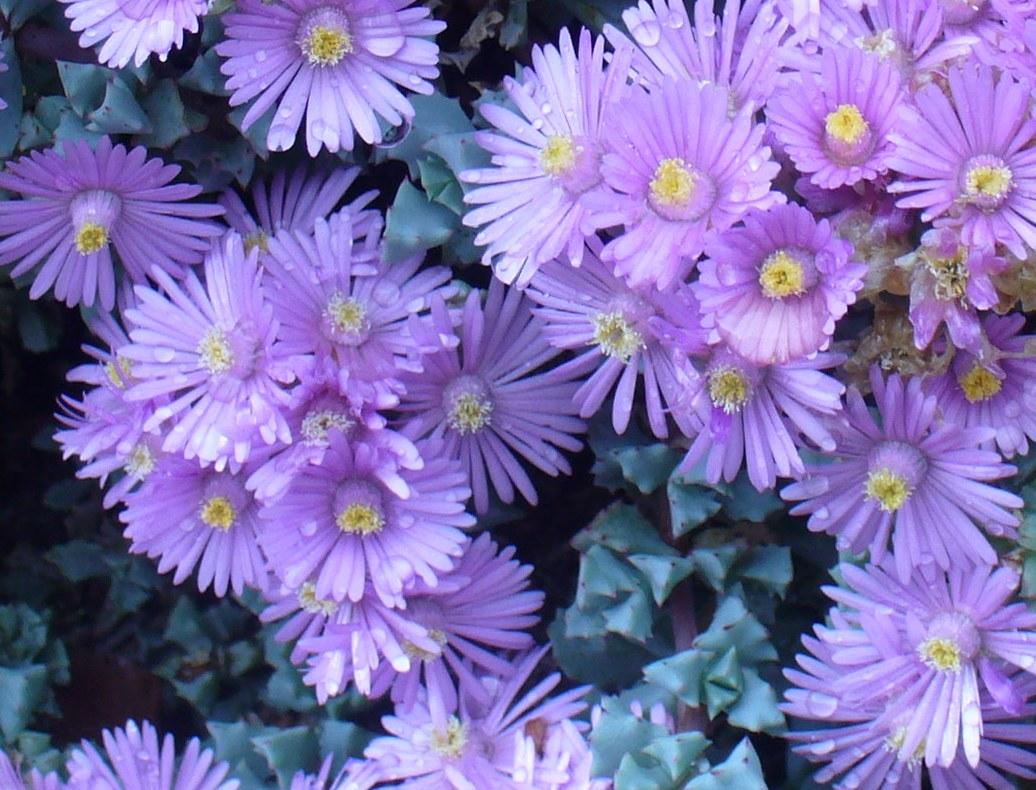

Oscularia deltoides, the deltoid-leaved dewplant, dassievygie or sandsteenvygie is a species of flowering succulent plant in the fig-marigold family Aizoaceae that is native to the south-western Cape, South Africa.

== Description ==
This intensely flowering plant is found growing among sandstone rocks in the winter-rainfall mountains of the far south-western corner of South Africa. Growing to 30 cm (12 in) high and spreading indefinitely, it has silver-blue foliage. The fat, succulent leaves are three-sided (hence the qualifier deltoides – "triangular"), with red teeth on the margins. The stems are often tinged purple.

In the spring it produces masses of pink, almond-scented flowers.

== Cultivation ==
It is increasingly grown in South African gardens as an ornamental plant and can easily be propagated from cuttings, which should be planted in a sunny position. This low-maintenance succulent spreads out forming a colourful mat and grows well on the rocky edge of flower beds where it cascades over the edge. It attracts butterflies. In colder temperate regions it requires winter protection or glass cover. It has gained the Royal Horticultural Society's Award of Garden Merit.

It was previously classed in the genus Lampranthus, as Lampranthus deltoides.
