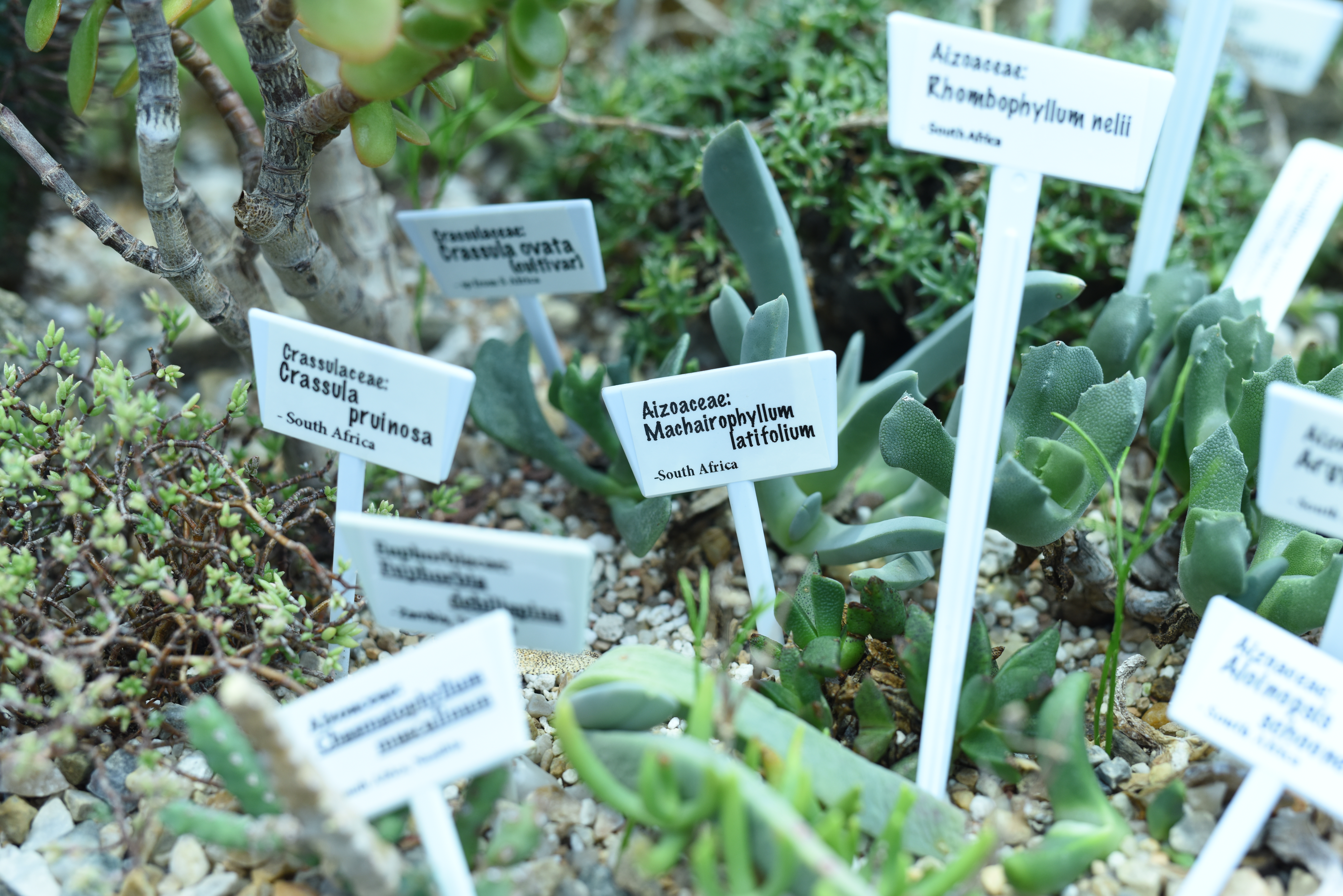

Scientific classification
- Kingdom: Plantae
- Clade: Tracheophytes
- Clade: Angiosperms
- Clade: Eudicots
- Order: Caryophyllales
- Family: Aizoaceae
- Genus: Rhombophyllum
- Species: R. nelii

Binomial name
- Rhombophyllum nelii Schwantes

Synonyms
- Hereroa dyeri L.Bolus

= Rhombophyllum nelii =

Species of plant

Rhombophyllum nelii is a succulent plant that is part of the Aizoaceae family. The species is endemic to South Africa and occurs in the Eastern Cape.
