= Oscularia cremnophila =

Scientific classification
- Kingdom: Plantae
- Clade: Tracheophytes
- Clade: Angiosperms
- Clade: Eudicots
- Order: Caryophyllales
- Family: Aizoaceae
- Genus: Oscularia
- Species: O. cremnophila

Binomial name
- Oscularia cremnophila van Jaarsv., Desmet & A.E.van Wyk

Species of succulent

Oscularia cremnophila is a perennial flowering plant belonging to the genus Oscularia. The species is endemic to the Western Cape and occurs at Lambert's Bay where it is part of the fynbos biome. The population consists of 24 plants that are threatened by mining activities.
