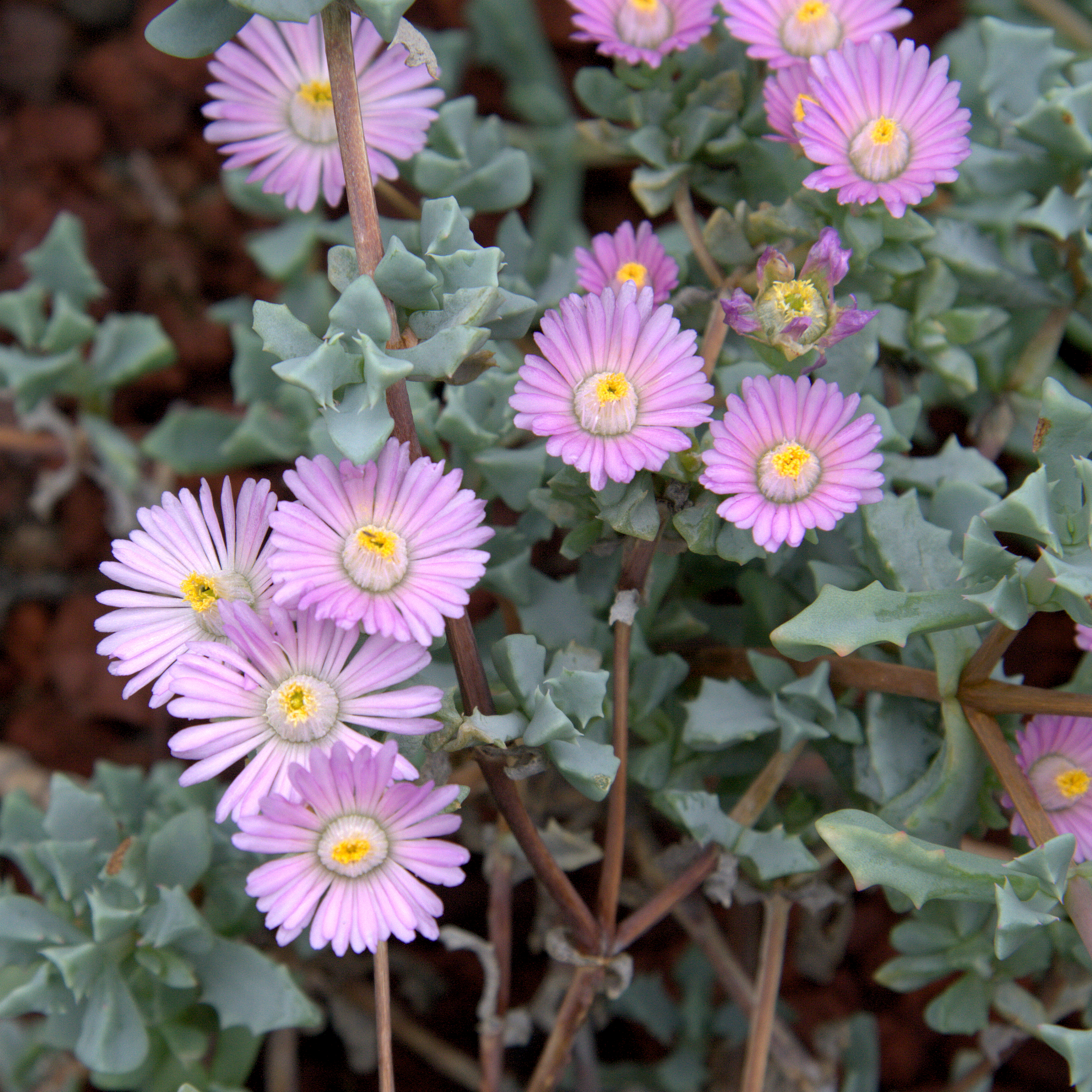
- Oscularia deltoides

Scientific classification
- Kingdom: Plantae
- Clade: Tracheophytes
- Clade: Angiosperms
- Clade: Eudicots
- Order: Caryophyllales
- Family: Aizoaceae
- Subfamily: Ruschioideae
- Tribe: Ruschieae
- Genus: Oscularia; Schwantes

Species
- 23 species, see text

= Oscularia =

Genus of succulents

Oscularia is a genus of succulent flowering plants in the family Aizoaceae, native to semi-arid and rocky habitats in the Western Cape of South Africa.

It was previously included within the related genus Lampranthus, but was split off as a separate genus, due to differences in its fruit and flower.

== Description ==
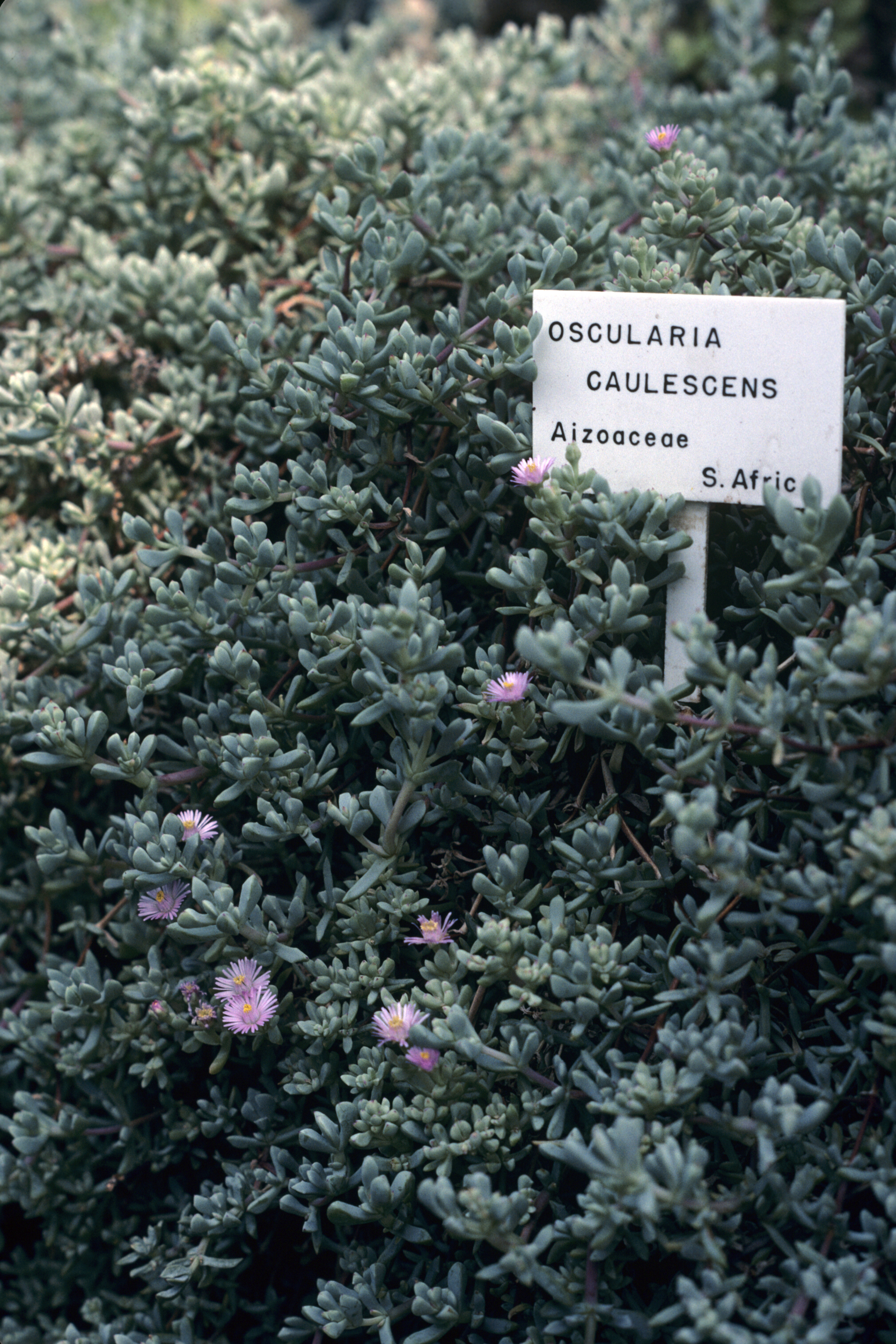
Oscularia caulescens

The most superficially recognisable feature of the genus is the shape of the leaves, which are grey-green and waxy. They are triangular in cross-section (3 angled) and can be sickle, club or mouth shaped. The name "Oscularia" actually means "group of tiny mouths" in Latin, and refers to the appearance of the toothed leaves in some species. The stems are often red, and the leaves can become red too during times of drought.

Abundant, almond-scented, daisy-like white or pink flowers appear throughout the summer.

== Distribution ==
The species are restricted to the Western Cape Province, South Africa, where they occur only in winter rainfall areas. Their habitat is typically rocky areas of sandstone.

The species Oscularia deltoides is cultivated as an ornamental garden plant.

== Species ==
23 species are accepted.

- Oscularia alba (L.Bolus) H.E.K.Hartmann
- Oscularia caulescens (Mill.) Schwantes
- Oscularia cedarbergensis (L.Bolus) H.E.K.Hartmann
- Oscularia compressa (L.Bolus) H.E.K.Hartmann
- Oscularia comptonii (L.Bolus) H.E.K.Hartmann
- Oscularia copiosa (L.Bolus) H.E.K.Hartmann
- Oscularia cremnophila van Jaarsv., Desmet & A.E.van Wyk
- Oscularia deltoides (L.) Schwantes
- Oscularia excedens (L.Bolus) H.E.K.Hartmann
- Oscularia guthrieae (L.Bolus) H.E.K.Hartmann
- Oscularia lunata (Willd.) H.E.K.Hartmann
- Oscularia major (Weston) Schwantes
- Oscularia ornata (L.Bolus) H.E.K.Hartmann
- Oscularia paardebergensis (L.Bolus) H.E.K.Hartmann
- Oscularia pedunculata (N.E.Br.) Schwantes
- Oscularia piquetbergensis (L.Bolus) H.E.K.Hartmann
- Oscularia prasina (L.Bolus) H.E.K.Hartmann
- Oscularia primiverna (L.Bolus) H.E.K.Hartmann
- Oscularia steenbergensis (L.Bolus) H.E.K.Hartmann
- Oscularia superans (L.Bolus) H.E.K.Hartmann
- Oscularia thermarum (L.Bolus) H.E.K.Hartmann
- Oscularia vernicolor (L.Bolus) H.E.K.Hartmann
- Oscularia vredenburgensis (L.Bolus) H.E.K.Hartmann
