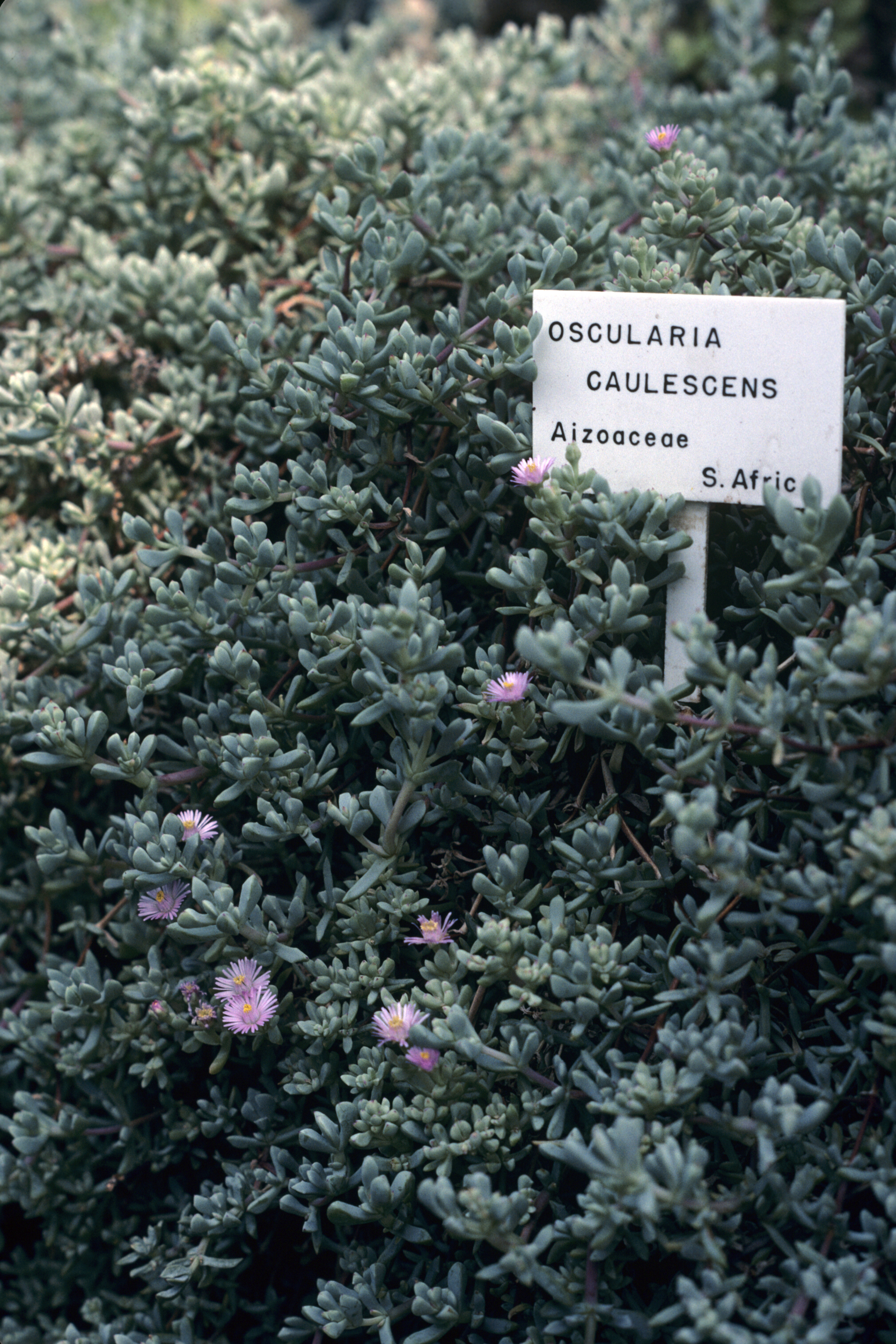

Scientific classification
- Kingdom: Plantae
- Clade: Tracheophytes
- Clade: Angiosperms
- Clade: Eudicots
- Order: Caryophyllales
- Family: Aizoaceae
- Genus: Oscularia
- Species: O. caulescens

Binomial name
- Oscularia caulescens (Mill.) Schwantes

Synonyms
- Lampranthus deltoides var. caulescens (Mill.) G.D.Rowley; Mesembryanthemum caulescens Mill.

= Oscularia caulescens =

Species of succulent

Oscularia caulescens, commonly known as the dassievygie, gum toothfig, or sandsteenvygie, is a perennial flowering plant belonging to the genus Oscularia. The species is endemic to the Western Cape.
