= Oscularia pedunculata =

Scientific classification
- Kingdom: Plantae
- Clade: Tracheophytes
- Clade: Angiosperms
- Clade: Eudicots
- Order: Caryophyllales
- Family: Aizoaceae
- Genus: Oscularia
- Species: O. pedunculata

Binomial name
- Oscularia pedunculata (N.E.Br.) Schwantes

Species of succulent

Oscularia pedunculata is a perennial flowering plant belonging to the genus Oscularia. The species is endemic to the Western Cape.
