= Vanheerdea divergens =

Scientific classification
- Kingdom: Plantae
- Clade: Tracheophytes
- Clade: Angiosperms
- Clade: Eudicots
- Order: Caryophyllales
- Family: Aizoaceae
- Genus: Vanheerdea
- Species: V. divergens

Binomial name
- Vanheerdea divergens (L.Bolus) L.Bolus ex S.A.Hammer)

Synonyms
- Rimaria divergens L.Bolus; Vanheerdia divergens (L.Bolus) L.Bolus

Species of succulent

Vanheerdea divergens is a small succulent plant that is part of the family Aizoaceae. The species is endemic to South Africa and occurs in the Northern Cape.
