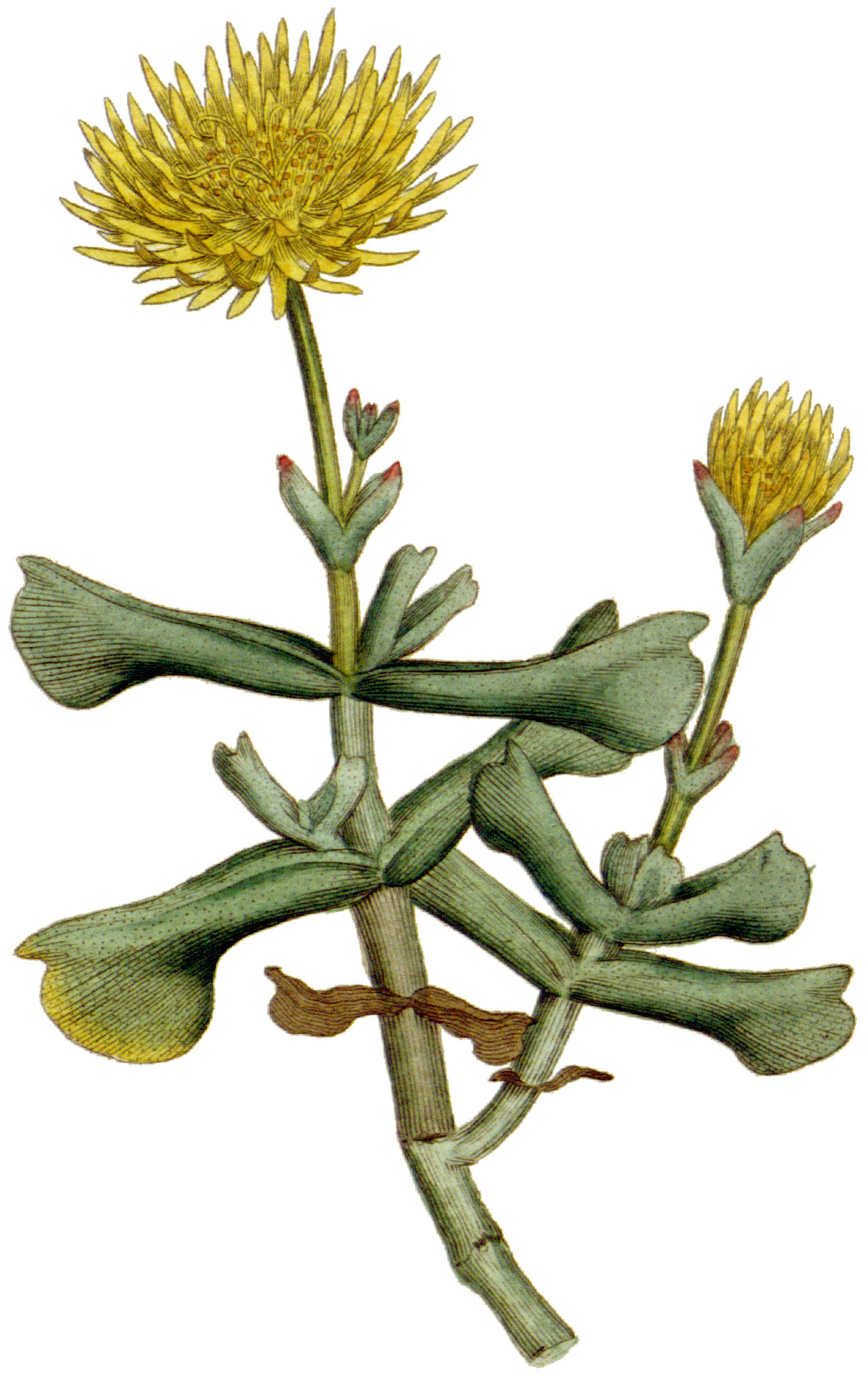

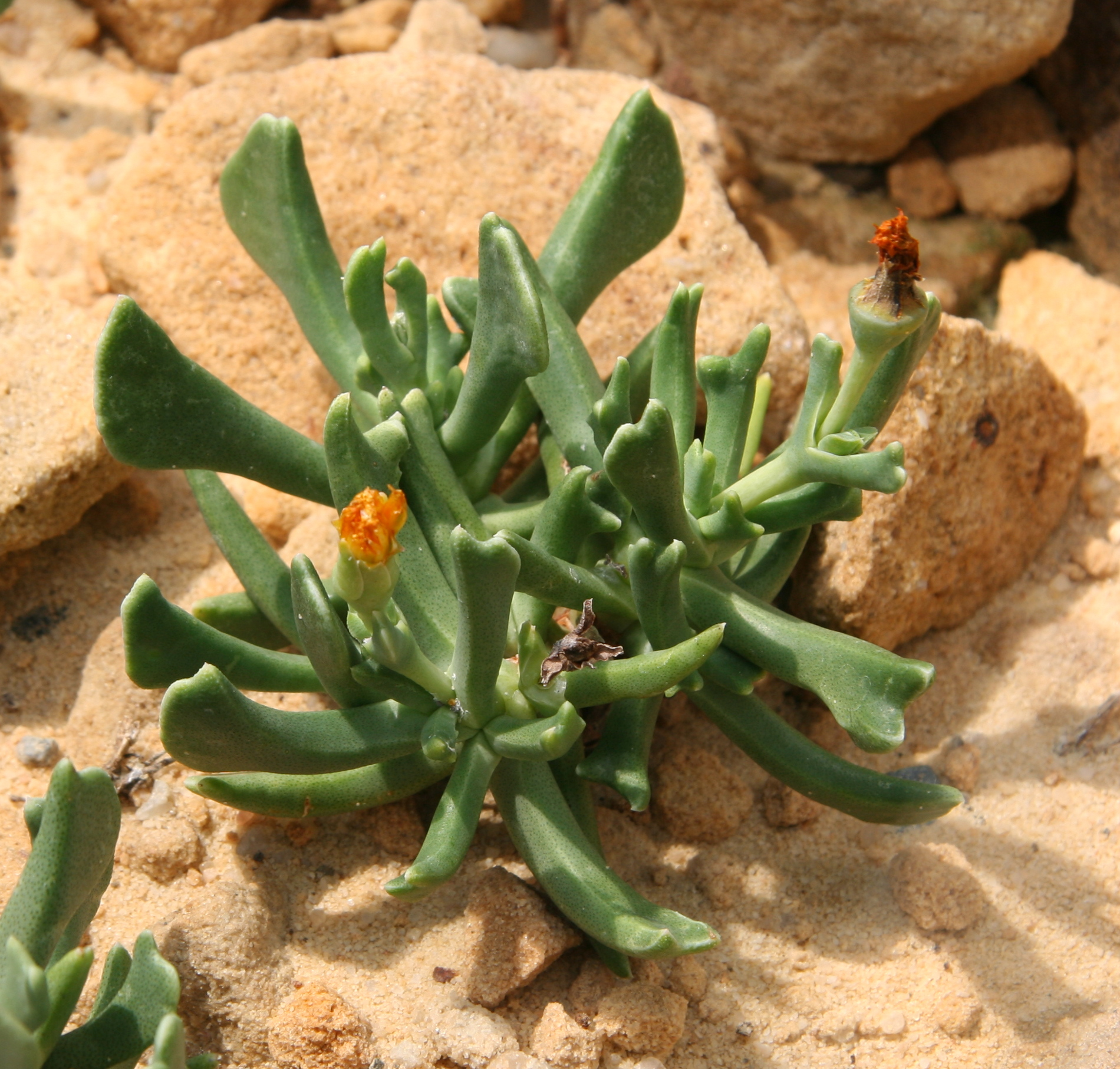

Scientific classification
- Kingdom: Plantae
- Clade: Tracheophytes
- Clade: Angiosperms
- Clade: Eudicots
- Order: Caryophyllales
- Family: Aizoaceae
- Genus: Rhombophyllum
- Species: R. dolabriforme

Binomial name
- Rhombophyllum dolabriforme (L.) Schwantes

Synonyms
- Hereroa dolabriformis (L.) L.Bolus; Mesembryanthemum dolabriforme L.; Mesembryanthemum dolabriformoides Haw.

= Rhombophyllum dolabriforme =

Species of plant

Rhombophyllum dolabriforme, commonly known as the elkhorn plant or hatchet plant, is a succulent plant in the Aizoaceae family. The species is endemic to South Africa and occurs in the Eastern Cape.
