= Rhombophyllum rhomboideum =

Scientific classification
- Kingdom: Plantae
- Clade: Embryophytes
- Clade: Tracheophytes
- Clade: Angiosperms
- Clade: Eudicots
- Order: Caryophyllales
- Family: Aizoaceae
- Genus: Rhombophyllum
- Species: R. rhomboideum

Binomial name
- Rhombophyllum rhomboideum (Salm-Dyck) Schwantes

Synonyms
- Bergeranthus rhomboideus (Salm-Dyck) Schwantes; Mesembryanthemum rhomboideum Salm-Dyck; Mesembryanthemum scapigerum Eckl. & Zeyh.

Species of flowering plant

Rhombophyllum rhomboideum, the diamond-leaved rhombophyllum, is a species of flowering plant in the family Aizoaceae, native to the eastern Cape Provinces of South Africa. A succulent, it has gained the Royal Horticultural Society's Award of Garden Merit.
