= Oscularia major =

Scientific classification
- Kingdom: Plantae
- Clade: Tracheophytes
- Clade: Angiosperms
- Clade: Eudicots
- Order: Caryophyllales
- Family: Aizoaceae
- Genus: Oscularia
- Species: O. major

Binomial name
- Oscularia major (Weston) Schwantes

Species of succulent

Oscularia major is a perennial flowering plant belonging to the genus Oscularia. The species is endemic to the Eastern Cape and the Western Cape.
