= Acrodon deminutus =

Scientific classification
- Kingdom: Plantae
- Clade: Tracheophytes
- Clade: Angiosperms
- Clade: Eudicots
- Order: Caryophyllales
- Family: Aizoaceae
- Genus: Acrodon
- Species: A. deminutus

Binomial name
- Acrodon deminutus Klak

South African mesemb species

Acrodon deminutus, also known as the Malgas tiptoothfig, is a species of mesemb from South Africa.

== Description ==
This spreading succulent grows up to 10 cm (3.9 in) tall. It has a diameter of up to 40 cm (1.3 ft). It has a tap root and only rarely has adventitious roots. The internodes are red when young, turning ochre with age. They do not have roots and grow up to 5–20 mm (0.20–0.79 in) long. The tringualar leaves are free almost to the base and grow 5–10 mm (0.20–0.39 in) long and borad and 6 mm (0.24 in) thick. They are green, blue-green or grey-green in colour and have toothed margins. The keel has two or three teeth and each margin has four or five teeth. It is the only species in the genus to also have teeth over the flat sides of the leaf in some leaves. The epidermal bladder cells are completely flattened.

Single flowers are borne on the ends of branches in September. The calyx has five lobes. The bracts grow closely around the short stem holding the flower, embracing the base of the flower. The petals are magenta at the tips and bases and white in between. They have a diameter of 15–20 mm (0.59–0.79 in). The filaments holding the stamens are white at the base and magenta at the tips.

The fruit is a 5-locular capsule that has a 5–7 mm (0.20–0.28 in) diameter. It is dark grey in colour. It has a flat top and shallow base with raised rimes. The closing body is lens shaped. The fruit opens through short keels becoming erect, causin the closing body to move from the base. The D-shaped seeds are brown. The testa cells are arraned in concentric rows. They are up to 1 mm (0.039 in) long and have an average mass of 20.7 mg (0.00073 oz).

== Distribution and habitat ==
This species is endemic to the Western Cape of South Africa. It grows in the Renosterveld biome between Swellendam and Bredasdorp. It grows on stony quartz outcrops on clay. It prefers gently sloping hills.

== Etymology ==
The species name comes from the Latin deminutus, which means reduced or diminutive. This refers to the small size of the leaves of this species.

== Conservation ==
This species is considered to be vulnerable by the South African National Biodiversity Institute. The Swellendam area is highly cultivated, and the plants are potentially at risk of being trampled by or grazed on by livestock in the four locations that they are known from.
