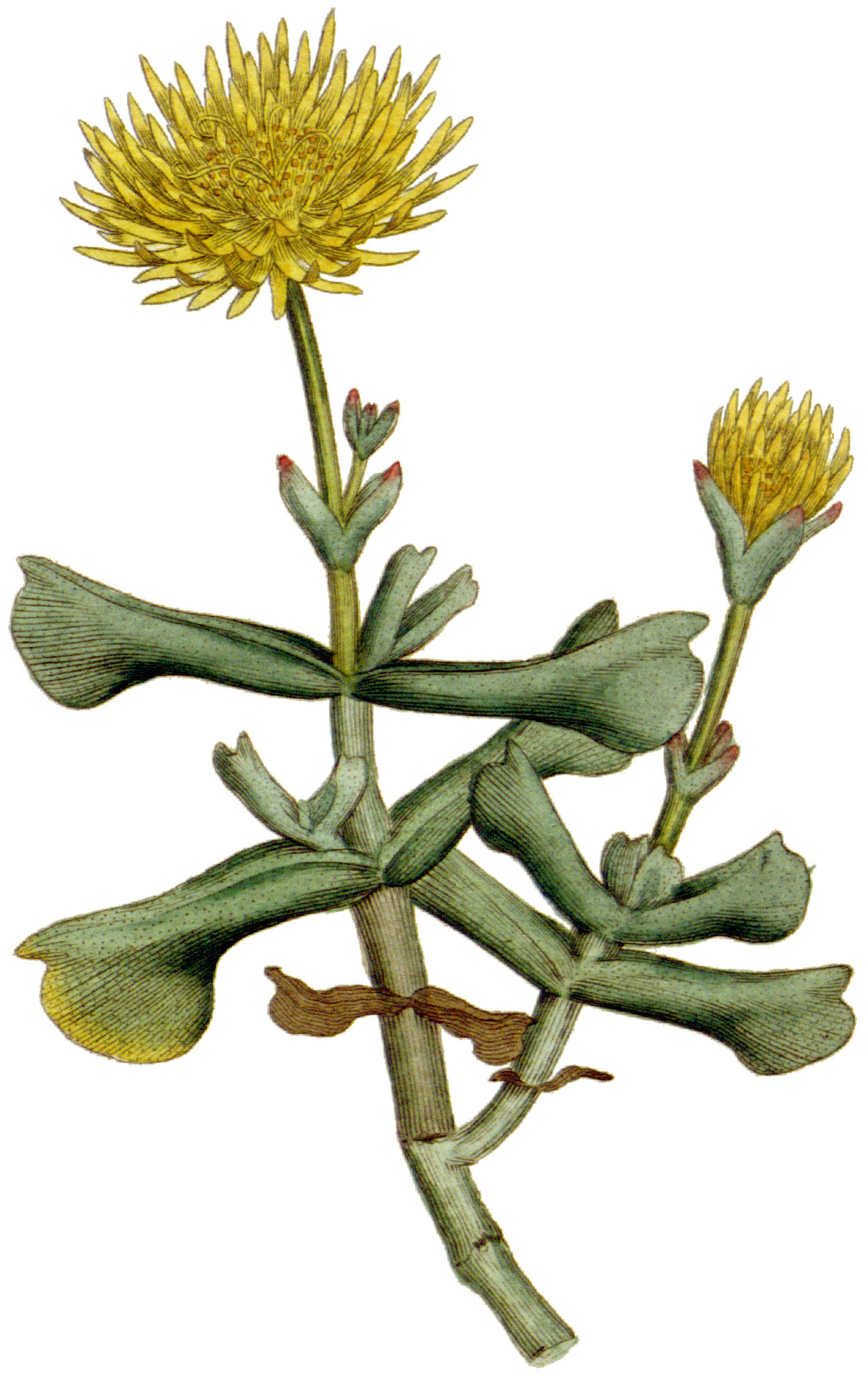
- Rhombophyllum dolabriforme

Scientific classification
- Kingdom: Plantae
- Clade: Tracheophytes
- Clade: Angiosperms
- Clade: Eudicots
- Order: Caryophyllales
- Family: Aizoaceae
- Subfamily: Ruschioideae
- Tribe: Ruschieae
- Genus: Rhombophyllum (Schwantes) Schwantes

Species
- See text

Synonyms
- Bergeranthus subg. Rhombophyllum Schwantes

= Rhombophyllum =

Genus of succulents

Rhombophyllum is a genus of succulent plants in the ice plant family, Aizoaceae. Members of the genus are native to the Cape Provinces of South Africa.

== Species ==
Five species are accepted.

- Rhombophyllum albanense (L.Bolus) H.E.K.Hartmann
- Rhombophyllum dolabriforme Schwantes
- Rhombophyllum dyeri (L.Bolus) H.E.K.Hartmann
- Rhombophyllum nelii Schwantes
- Rhombophyllum rhomboideum (Salm-Dyck) Schwantes
