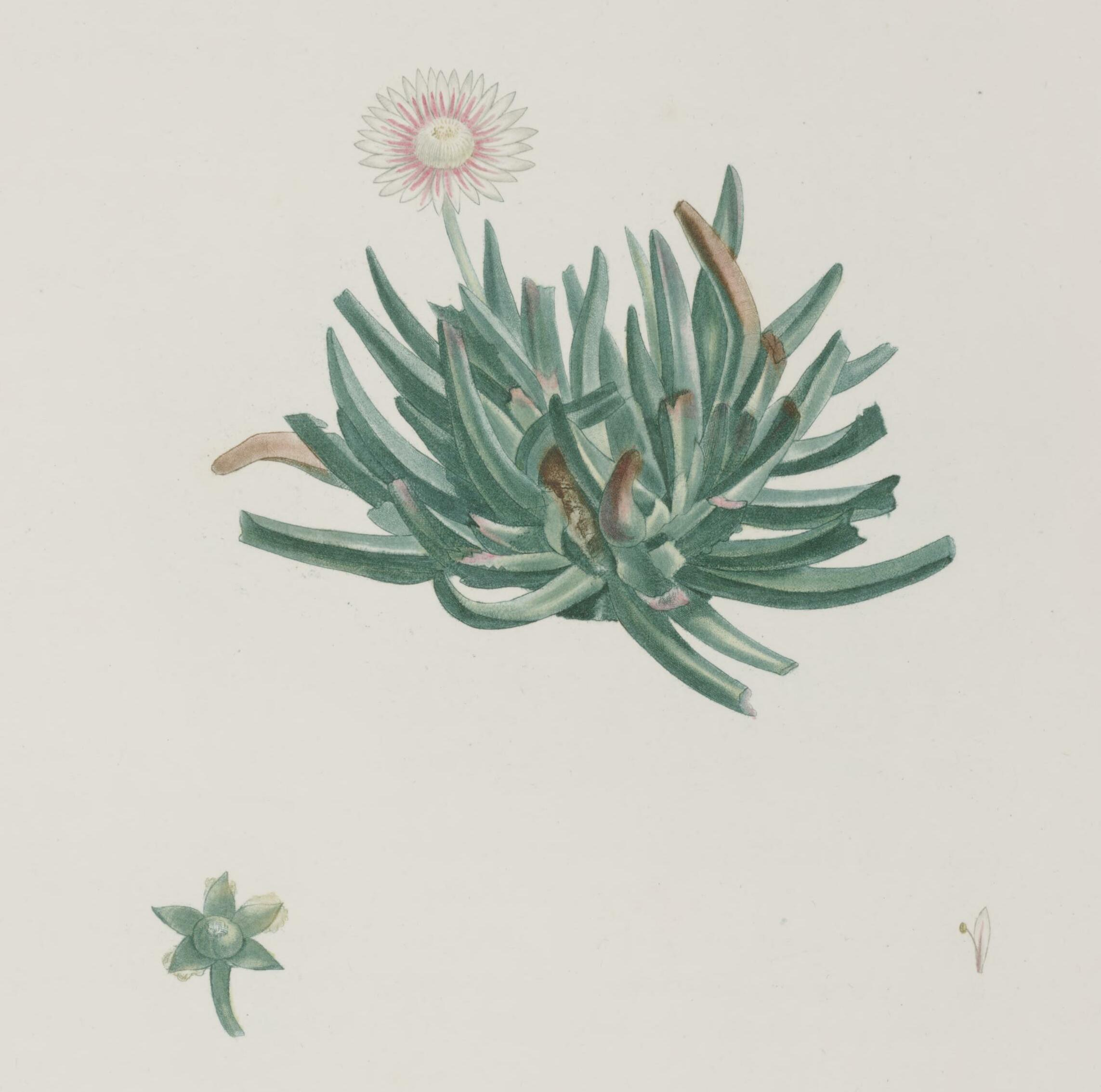

Scientific classification
- Kingdom: Plantae
- Clade: Tracheophytes
- Clade: Angiosperms
- Clade: Eudicots
- Order: Caryophyllales
- Family: Aizoaceae
- Genus: Acrodon
- Species: A. bellidiflorus

Binomial name
- Acrodon bellidiflorus (L.) N.E.Br.

Synonyms
- Acrodon bellidiflorus var. striatus (Haw.) N.E.Br.; Acrodon bellidiflorus var. viridis (Haw.) N.E.Br.; Acrodon duplessiae (L.Bolus) H.F.Glen; Mesembryanthemum acaule L.; Mesembryanthemum bellidiflorum Dill.; Mesembryanthemum bellidiflorum L.; Mesembryanthemum bellidiflorum var. glaucescens Haw.; Mesembryanthemum bellidiflorum var. striatum Haw.; Mesembryanthemum bellidiflorum var. viride Haw.; Mesembryanthemum bellidifolium L.; Ruschia constricta L.Bolus; Ruschia duplessiae L.Bolus; Ruschia graminea Jacobsen; Ruschia longifolia L.Bolus; Ruschia macrophylla L.Bolus

= Acrodon bellidiflorus =

South African mesemb species

Acrodon bellidiflorus, the common tiptoothfig, is a mesemb species from South Africa.

== Description ==
Acrodon bellidiflorus is a compact succulent perennial plant. It has a woody taproot with fine roots growing off it. This is the only species in its genus where this trait is common

The deep green leaves are triangular. They have a persistent seeth [sic?] that turns black with age. The keel and margins may be smooth or may have three or four flexible teeth with broad bases. The number of teeth may also vary between populations. The eastern populations have short visible internodes. Internodes are not visible in other populations.

The flowers are white or pale pink in colour and have a diameter of about 35 mm (1.4 in). There is only a single flower at the tip of each flowering branch. They are present between April and July.

== Distribution and habitat ==
This species is endemic to South Africa. It is found growing between McGregor and Bredasdorp and the Klein Karoo. It grows in areas that have renosterveld, coastal fynbos or grassland biomes.

== Taxonomy ==
Initially, Acrodon bellidiflorus was the only species in its genus. A closer examination of Ruschia in 1986, however, found that several species shared traits with Acrodon bellidiflorus, resulting in them being moved to the genus Acrodon.

== Conservation ==
This species is considered to be of least concern by the South African National Biodiversity Institute.
