= Brianhuntleya =

Scientific classification
- Kingdom: Plantae
- Clade: Tracheophytes
- Clade: Angiosperms
- Clade: Eudicots
- Order: Caryophyllales
- Family: Aizoaceae
- Subfamily: Ruschioideae
- Tribe: Ruschieae
- Genus: Brianhuntleya; Chess., S.A.Hammer & I.Oliv.

Genus of flowering plants

Brianhuntleya is a genus of flowering plants belonging to the family Aizoaceae. It is native to the Cape Provinces of South Africa.

Species:

- Brianhuntleya intrusa (Kensit) Chess., S.A.Hammer & I.Oliv.
- Brianhuntleya purpureostyla (L.Bolus) H.E.K.Hartmann
- Brianhuntleya quarcicola (H.E.K.Hartmann) H.E.K.Hartmann
