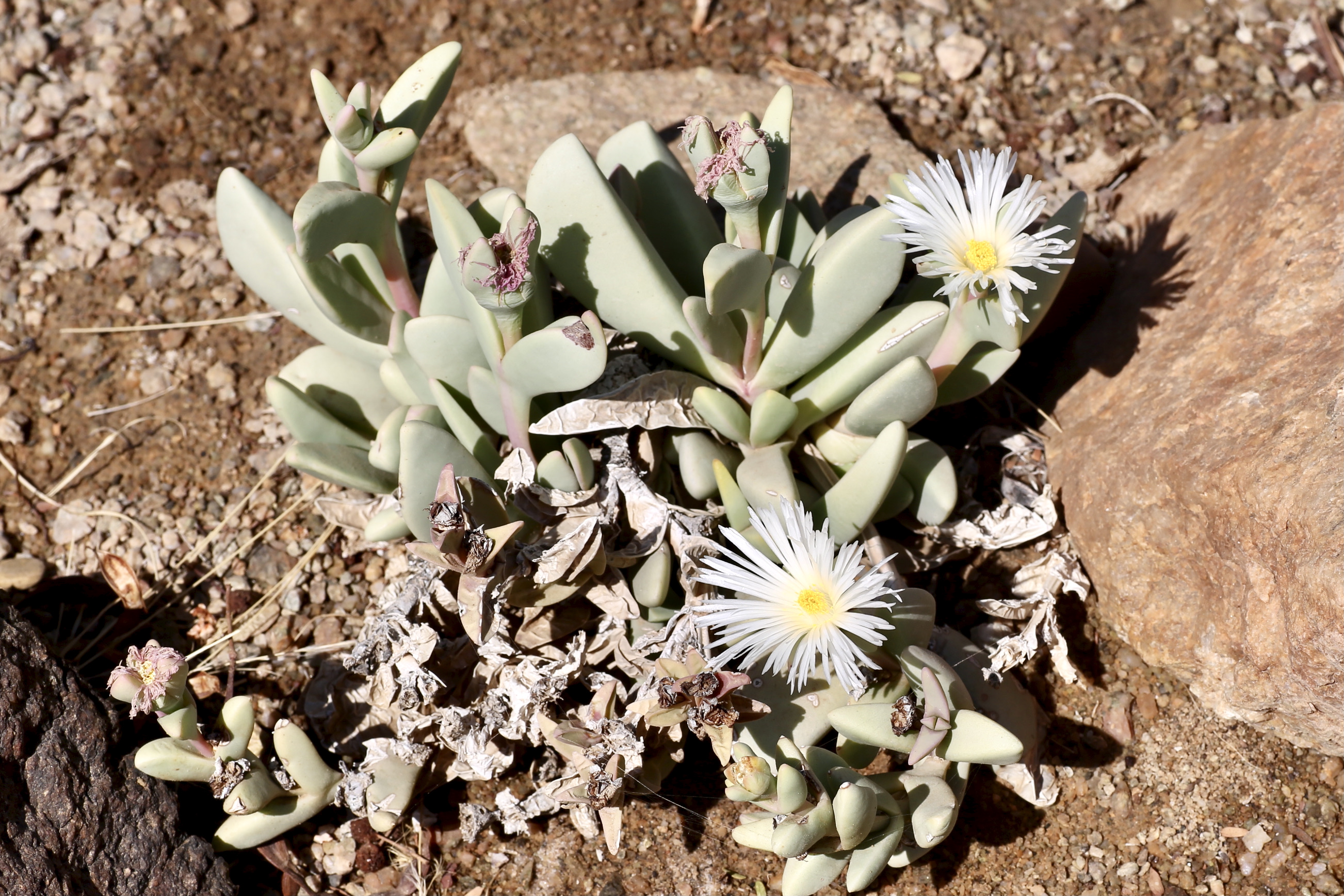
- Hartmanthus pergamentaceus in ǀAi-ǀAis/Richtersveld Transfrontier Park

Scientific classification
- Kingdom: Plantae
- Clade: Tracheophytes
- Clade: Angiosperms
- Clade: Eudicots
- Order: Caryophyllales
- Family: Aizoaceae
- Subfamily: Ruschioideae
- Tribe: Ruschieae
- Genus: Hartmanthus; S.A.Hammer

Type species
- Hartmanthus pergamentaceus L. Bolus

= Hartmanthus =

Genus of succulents

Hartmanthus is a genus of subtropical, succulent flowering plants in the family Aizoaceae, native to the lower Orange River in ǁKaras, Namibia and Northern Cape, South Africa.

== Description ==
Plants grow as densely leaved dwarf shrubs. Their leaves are up to 70mm long, 15mm wide, and 20mm thick; they have a smooth, firm surface and remain attached for years after drying out. Inflorescence is in the form of 75-117 white to pink flowers 45-55mm in size; internodes are orange. Its seeds are egg-shaped, reddish-brown and are 0.9mm to 1mm in length.

== Taxonomy ==
Plants in Hartmanthus were placed in Delosperma by Louisa Bolus and were separated in 1995.

== Species ==
- Hartmanthus hallii (L. Bolus)
- Hartmanthus pergamentaceus (L. Bolus)
