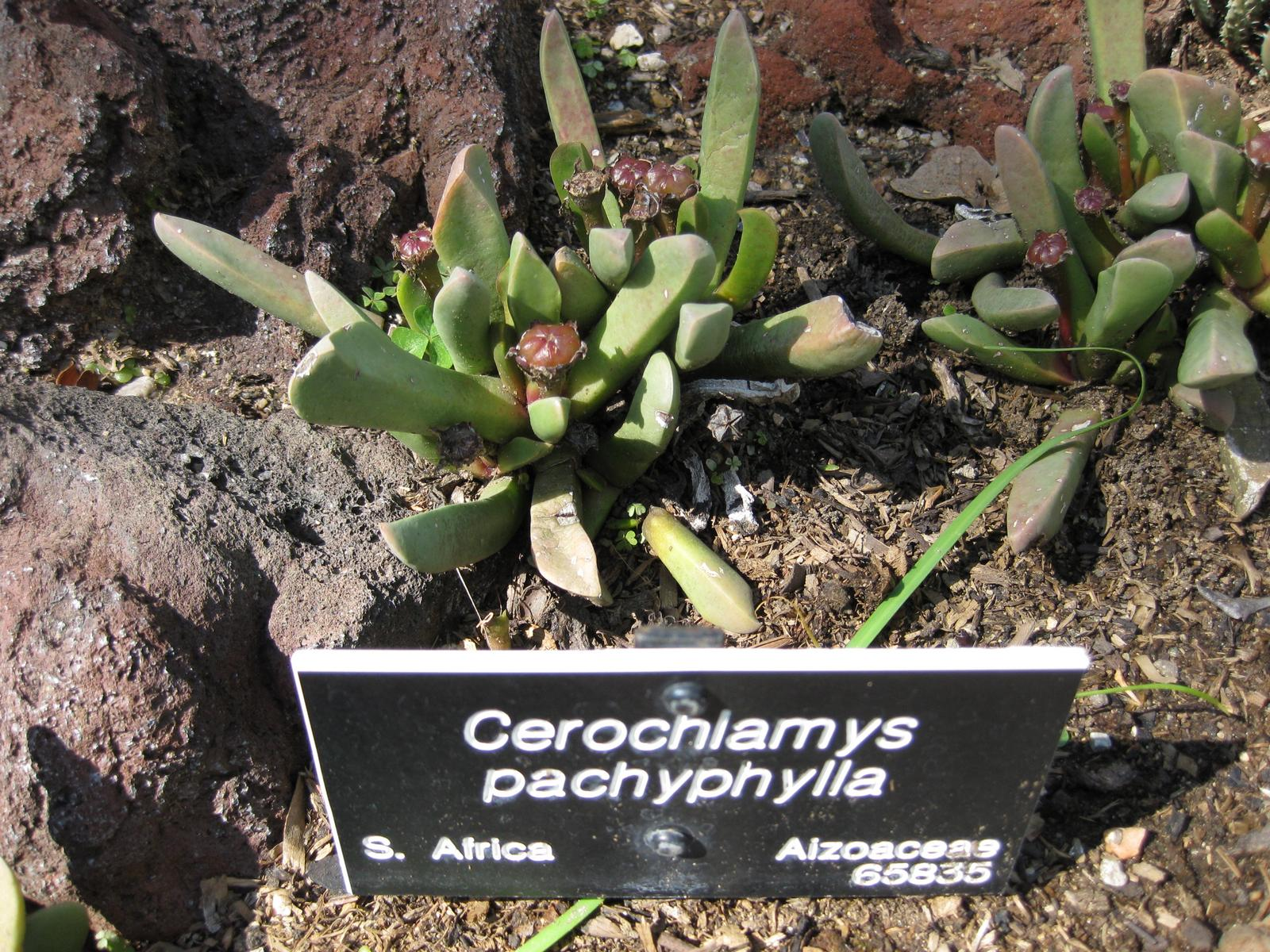

Scientific classification
- Kingdom: Plantae
- Clade: Tracheophytes
- Clade: Angiosperms
- Clade: Eudicots
- Order: Caryophyllales
- Family: Aizoaceae
- Subfamily: Ruschioideae
- Tribe: Ruschieae
- Genus: Cerochlamys; N.E.Br. (1928)

= Cerochlamys =

Genus of succulents

Cerochlamys is a genus of plants in the family Aizoaceae. They are all succulent plants, with fleshy, water-storing leaves. These plants bear small, somewhat daisy-like flowers, usually in shades of pink or purple. The genus is endemic to the southern Cape Provinces of South Africa.

== Species ==
Three species are accepted.

- Cerochlamys gemina (L.Bolus) H.E.K.Hartmann
- Cerochlamys pachyphylla (L.Bolus) L.Bolus
- Cerochlamys trigona N.E.Br.
