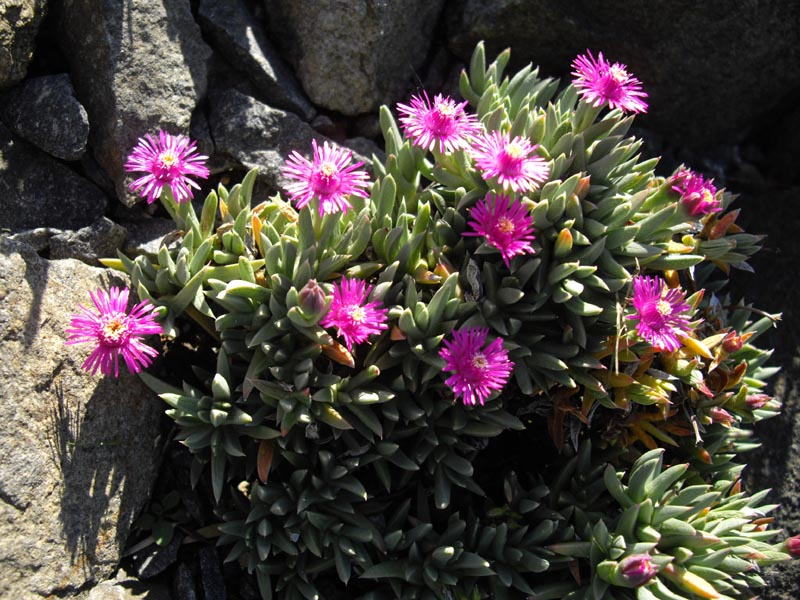
- Ruschia pulvinaris

Scientific classification
- Kingdom: Plantae
- Clade: Tracheophytes
- Clade: Angiosperms
- Clade: Eudicots
- Order: Caryophyllales
- Family: Aizoaceae
- Subfamily: Ruschioideae
- Tribe: Ruschieae
- Genus: Ruschia; Schwantes, 1926

= Ruschia =

Genus of succulents

Ruschia is a genus of succulent plant, in the family Aizoaceae, indigenous to the dryer parts of southern Africa.

== Description ==
Typical features of the genus include grey or blue-green succulent leaves, that are 3-sided or triangular in cross-section and are often covered with tiny darker transparent spots. Occasionally the leaves also have toothed margins.

Another common feature is the small, year-round, pink or white flower clusters.

The genus can be distinguished with certainty though, by its seed capsules. As with most Aizoaceae, these are hygrochastic, with triangular valves that open and close with changes in humidity. The seed capsule valves of Ruschia have a little closing body to pull them closed when they dry again, and two keels on either side of the closing body, which expand and push open the valve. There is a covering membrane too, which partially covers the seeds, to prevent them all being washed away immediately.

In contrast, the seed chambers of Delosperma have no covering membrane, leaving the seeds entirely exposed when the capsule opens. The seed chamber valves of genus Lampranthus have only the two expanding keels while the closing body is present, but not visible, and Lampranthus valves also have wings on either side.

== Species ==
Over 400 species are described, though many have subsequently been moved to the new genus Antimima. 208 species are accepted by Plants of the World Online.

Species occur in Lesotho, South Africa (including the Cape Provinces, Free State and Northern Provinces) and Namibia:

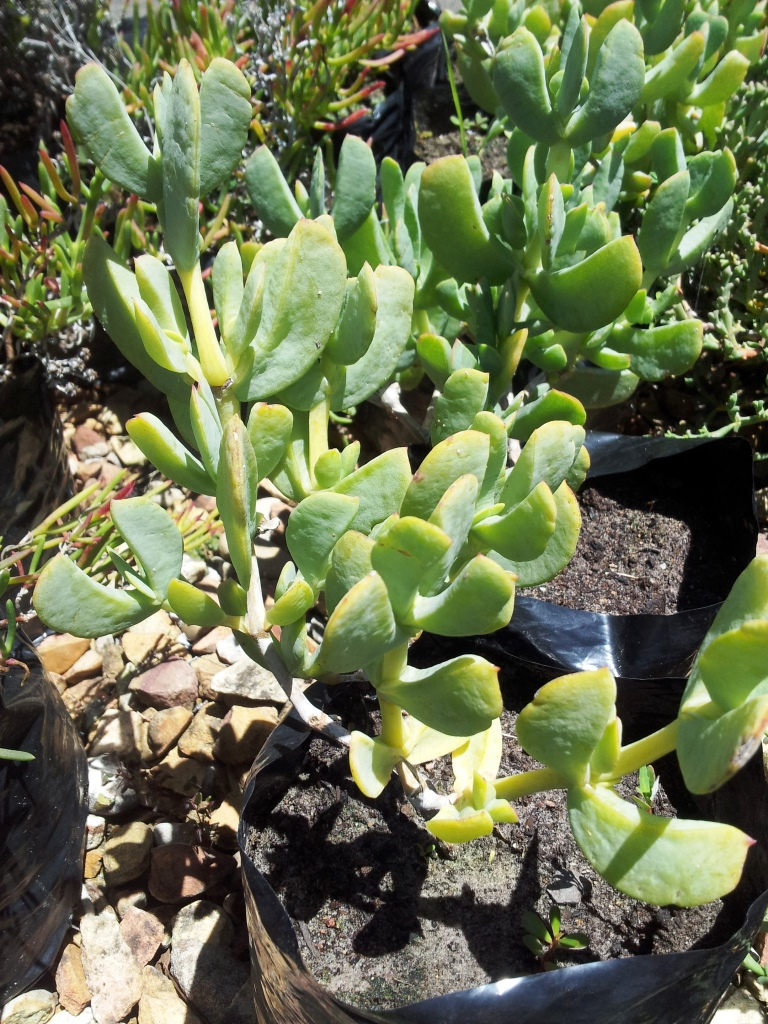
Ruschia maxima

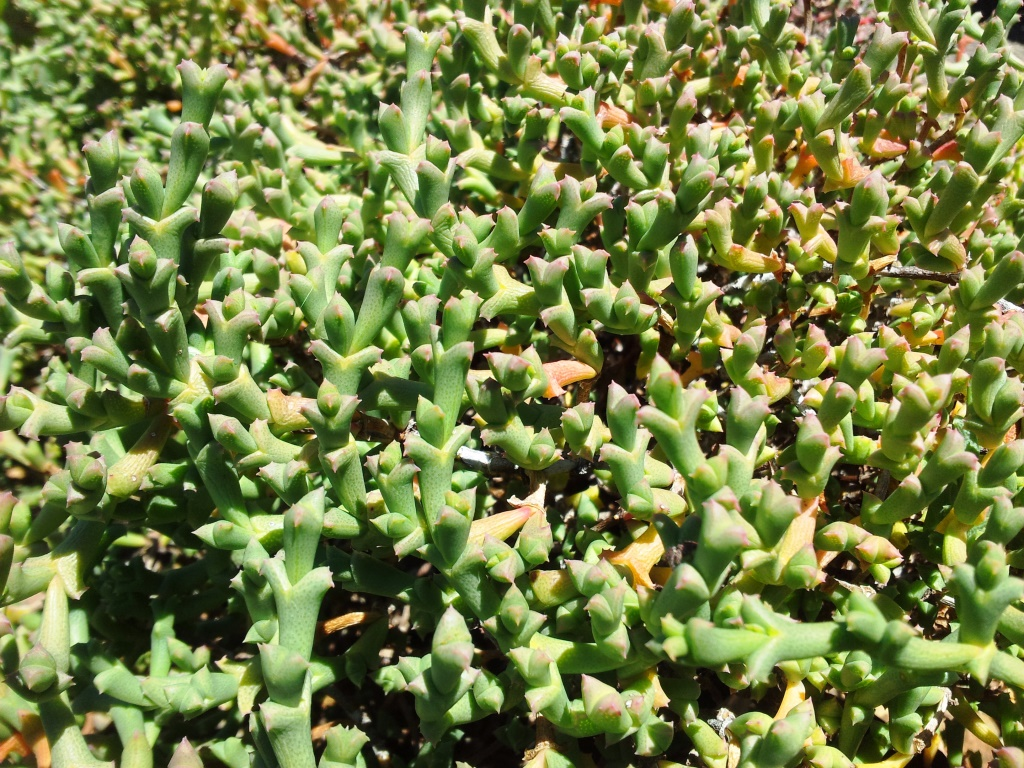
Ruschia karooica

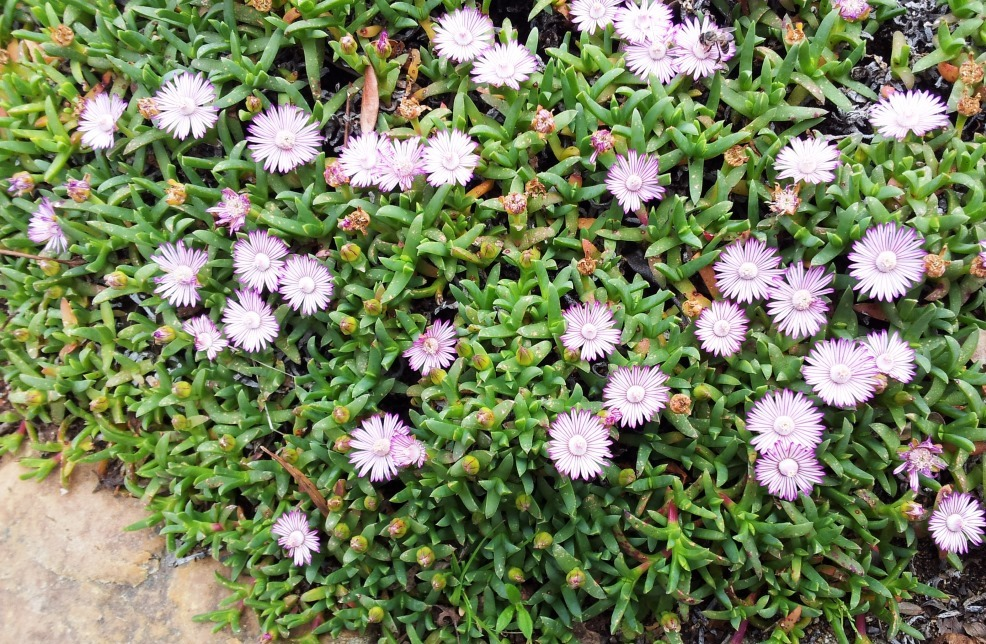
Ruschia lineolata

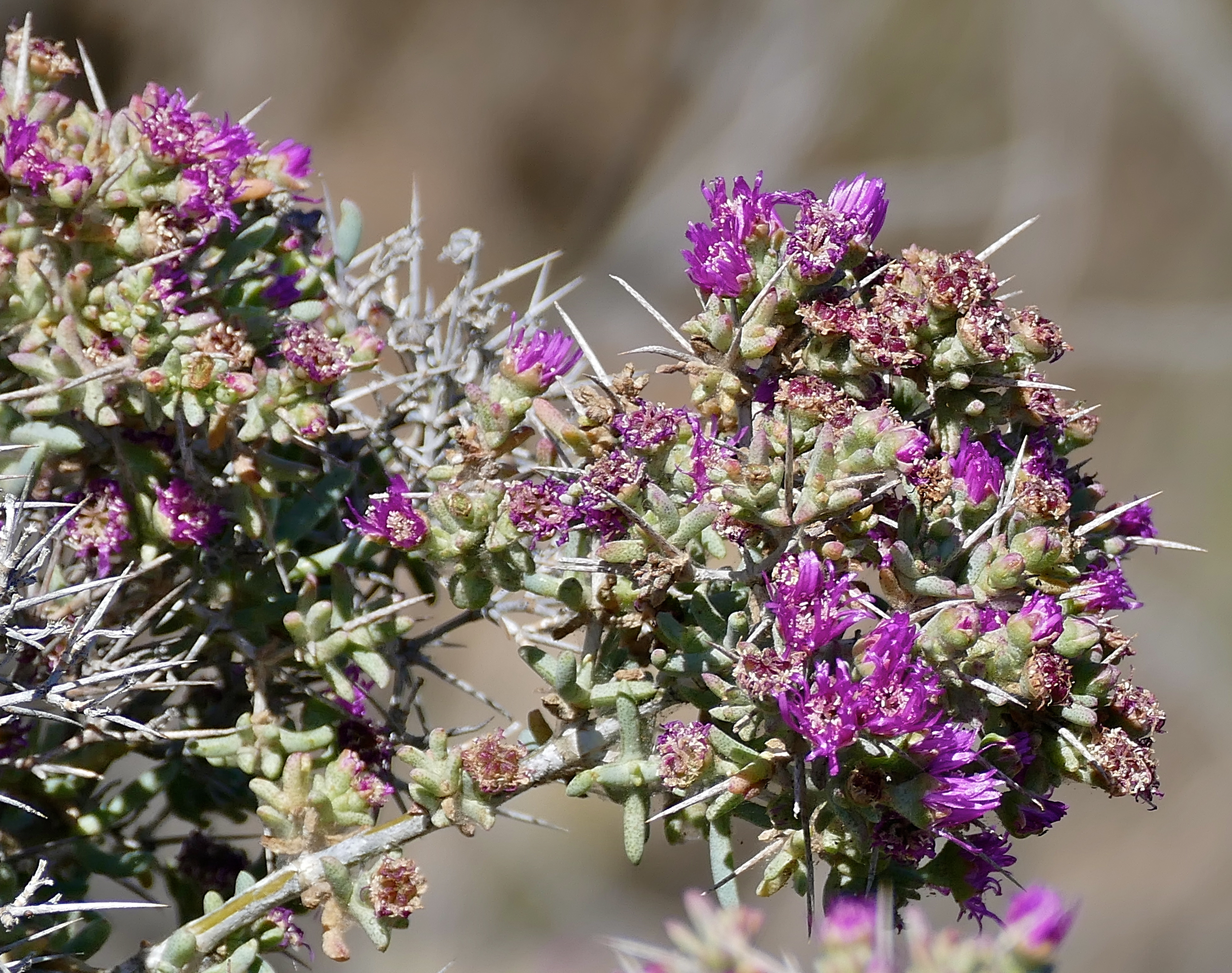
Ruschia spinosa

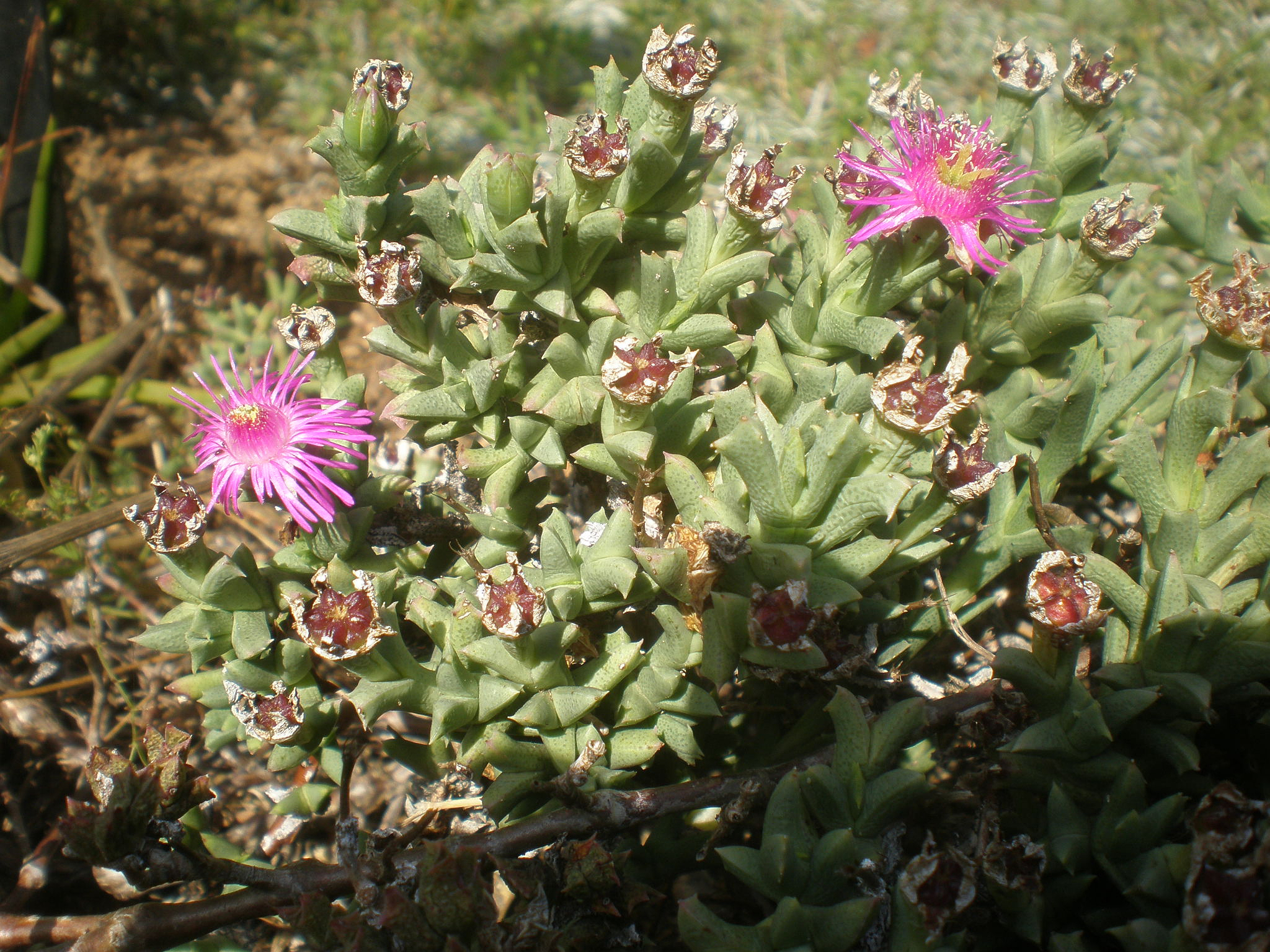
Ruschia uncinata

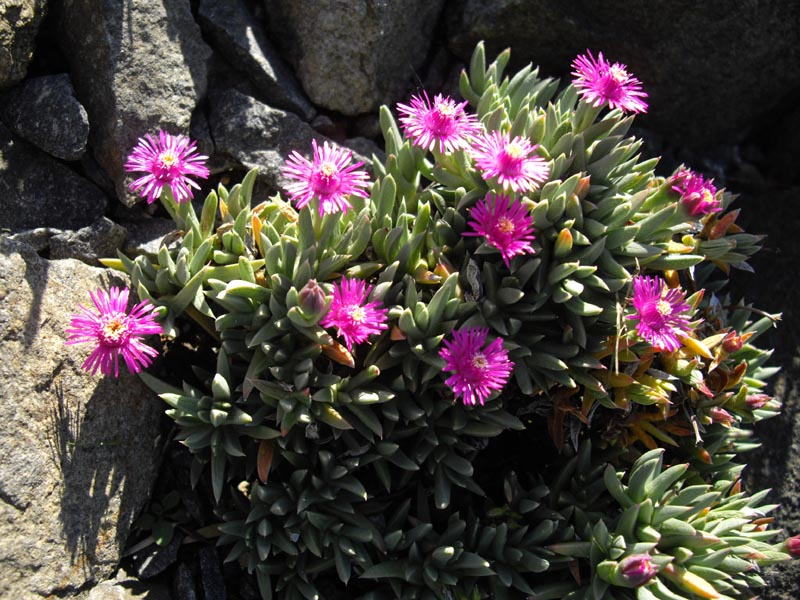
Ruschia pulvinaris

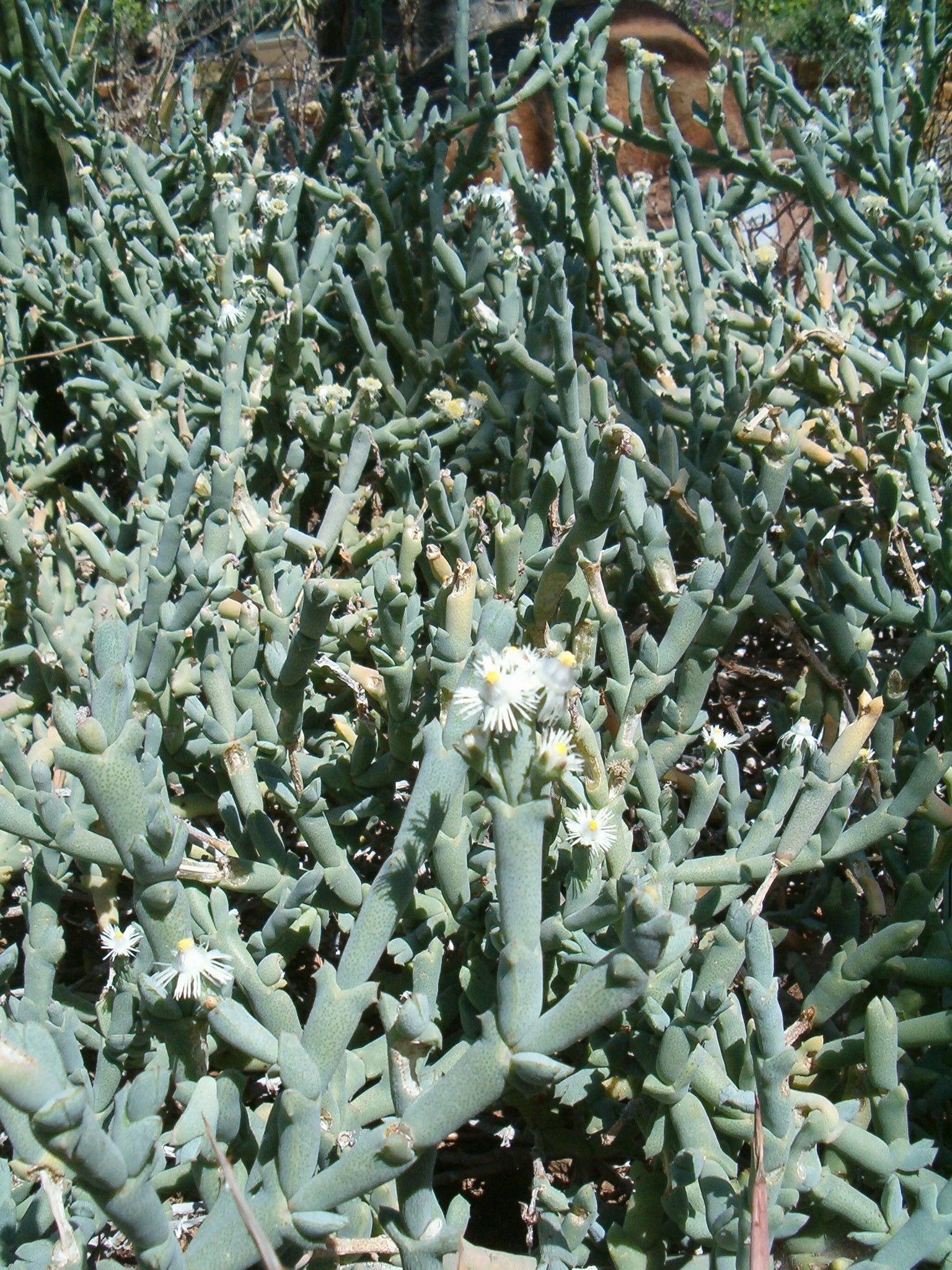
Ruschia crassa
