= Heidrun Hartmann =

German botanist (1942–2016)

Heidrun Hartmann (née Heidrun Elsbeth Klara Osterwald; 5 August 1942, Kolberg – 11 July 2016) was a German botanist.

She worked at the University of Hamburg and specialised in Aizoaceae, Crassulaceae, collected plants from Africa and South America.

She was honoured in 1995 when botanist Steven Allen Hammer published Hartmanthus an African genus of tropical, succulent flowering plants in the family Aizoaceae.
