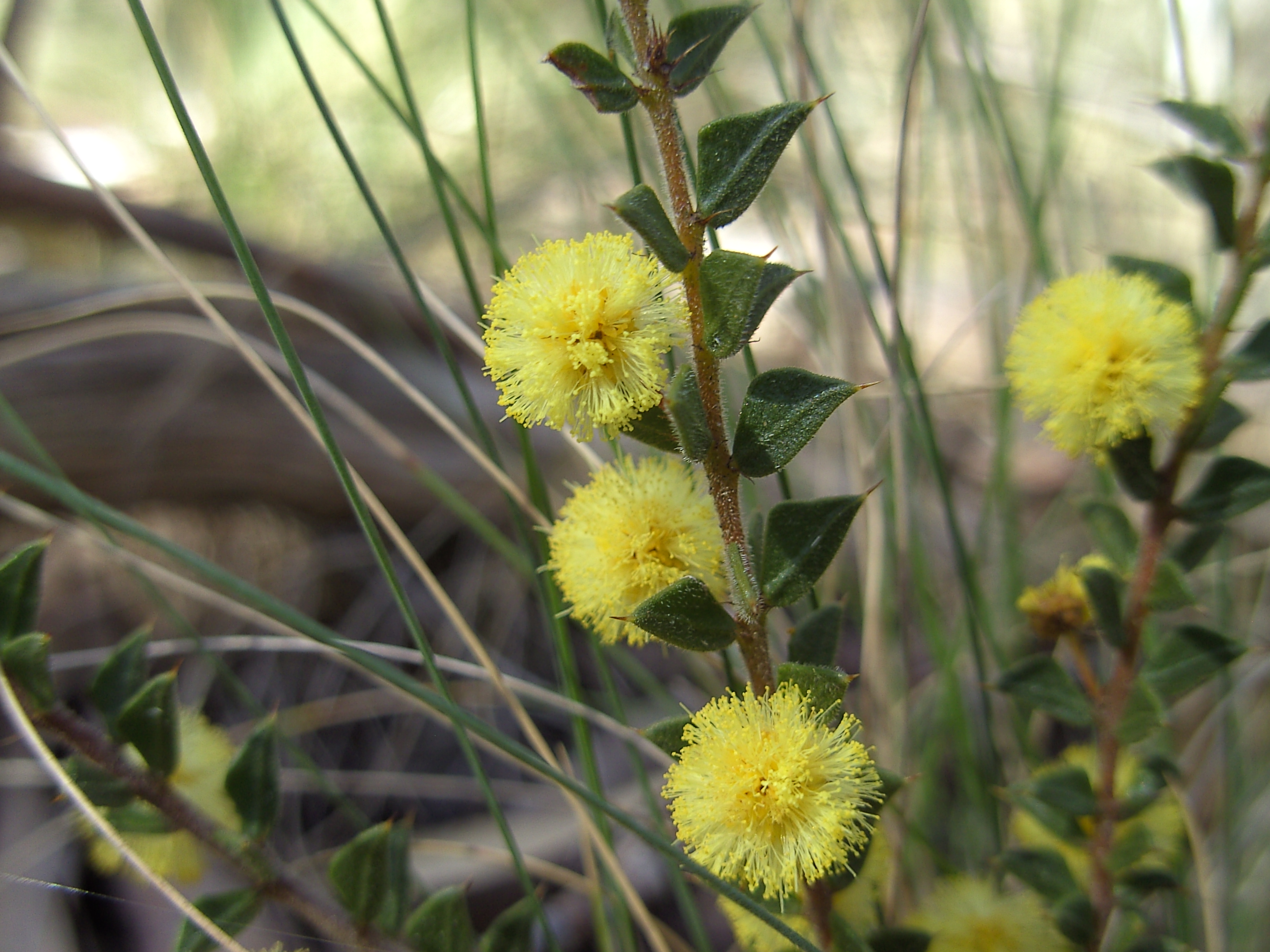

Scientific classification
- Kingdom: Plantae
- Clade: Tracheophytes
- Clade: Angiosperms
- Clade: Eudicots
- Clade: Rosids
- Order: Fabales
- Family: Fabaceae
- Subfamily: Caesalpinioideae
- Clade: Mimosoid clade
- Genus: Acacia
- Species: A. gunnii

Binomial name
- Acacia gunnii Benth.
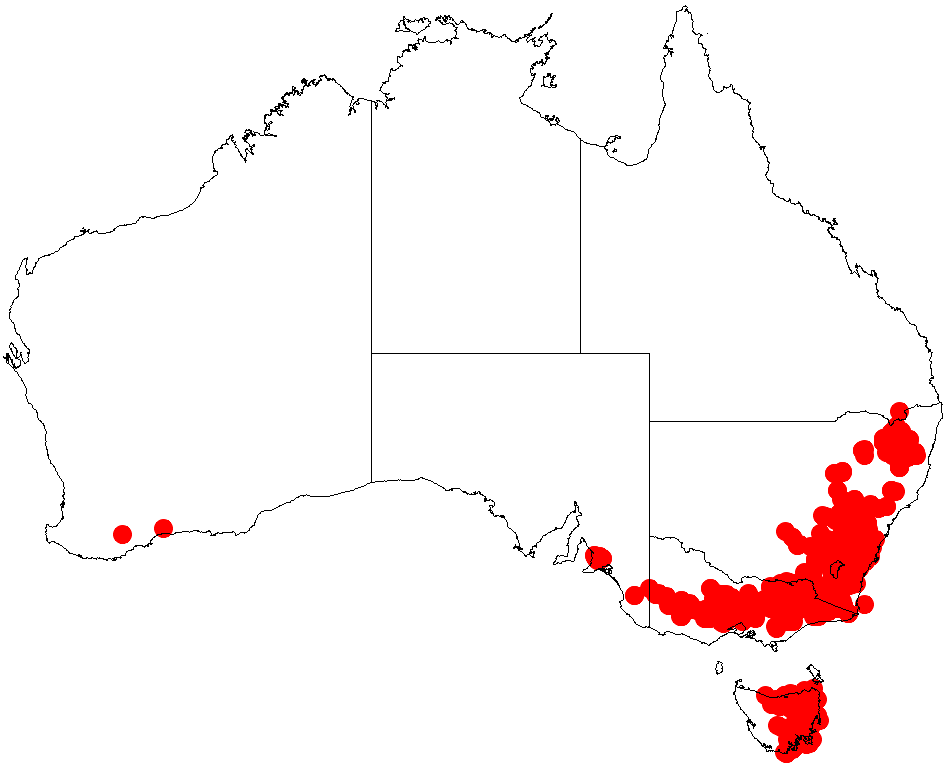
- Occurrence data from AVH

Synonyms
- Acacia gunnii var. angustifolia Benth.; Acacia gunnii Benth. var. gunnii; Acacia gunnii var. hirsutior Benth.; Acacia vomeriformis A.Cunn. ex Benth.; Racosperma gunnii (Benth.) Pedley

= Acacia gunnii =

Ploughshare wattle

Species of plant

Acacia gunnii, commonly known as ploughshare wattle or dog's tooth wattle, is a species of flowering plant in the family Fabaceae and is endemic to south-eastern Australia. It is a diffuse, prostrate or erect shrub with more or less sessile, variably shaped phyllodes, usually with a rigid, sharply pointed rounded or triangular angle on the upper edge, spherical heads of cream-coloured to pale yellow flowers and firmly papery to thinly leathery, dark brown to blackish pods.

== Description ==
Acacia gunnii is a diffuse, prostrate or erect shrub that typically grows to a height of up to 1 m (3 ft 3 in) and usually has hairy branchlets. Its phyllodes are more or less sessile and variably shaped, 4–15 mm (0.16–0.59 in) long and 1.5–4 mm (0.059–0.157 in) wide, usually with a sharply pointed, rigid, rounded or triangular angle on the upper edge near or below the middle. There are persistent stipules at the base of the phyllodes. The flowers are borne in a spherical heads in axils on a peduncle 4–10 mm (0.16–0.39 in) long, each head with 20 to 30 cream-coloured to pale yellow flowers. Flowering usually occurs between July and October, and the pods are firmly papery to thinly leathery, up to 40 mm (1.6 in) long and 4–5 mm (0.16–0.20 in) wide, dark brown to blackish and glabrous. The seeds are broadly elliptic to spherical, about 3 mm (0.12 in) long and lack an aril.

== Taxonomy ==
Acacia gunnii was first formally described in 1855 by George Bentham in Hooker's London of Botany. The specific epithet (gunnii) honours Ronald Campbell Gunn, who collected the lectotype in Tasmania in the 1830s.

== Distribution and habitat ==
Ploughshare wattle is widespread and locally abundant in eastern Australia on the Great Dividing Range and its associated slopes from the Grampians in Victoria, through New South Wales and the Australian Capital Territory to near Stanthorpe in Queensland where it grows in open Eucalyptus forest. It also occurs in the far south-east of South Australia, and in Tasmania where it also grows in coastal heath.

== See also ==
- List of Acacia species
