= Green pig =

Green pig may refer to:

- Fluorescent green pig, a transgenic pig expressing green fluorescent protein
- The targets in the Angry Birds video game and franchise
- A character in The Little Green Pig, a story within the play The Pillowman
- A rath in the nonsense poem Jabberwocky
- Magically created pigs in Disney Princess Enchanted Tales: Follow Your Dreams
- A character in the Malazan Book of the Fallen
- A minor character in the manga series Super Pig
- Hawk's mother in The Seven Deadly Sins manga series
- The cover of À la Carte, an album by Erste Allgemeine Verunsicherung

== See also ==
- Green pig-face, a flower
- Last One Home is a Green Pig, a children's book by Edith Thacher Hurd
