= Gunniopsis zygophylloides =

Scientific classification
- Kingdom: Plantae
- Clade: Tracheophytes
- Clade: Angiosperms
- Clade: Eudicots
- Order: Caryophyllales
- Family: Aizoaceae
- Genus: Gunniopsis
- Species: G. zygophylloides

Binomial name
- Gunniopsis zygophylloides (F.Muell.) Diels

Species of plant

Gunniopsis zygophylloides, commonly known as the twin-leaf pigface, is a succulent plant in the iceplant family, Aizoaceae. It is endemic to Australia.

The greenish perennial shrub typically grows to a height of 60 centimetres (24 in). It has green to yellow-green leaves that are ovate to obovate in shape. Leaves are up to 58 mm (2.28 in) long and 24 mm (0.94 in). It blooms between July and October producing solitary green and yellow flowers.

The plant is found in rocky areas on ranges and on shale or quartzite. It is distributed through north central parts of South Australia and also in the southern portion of the Northern Territory.

The species was formally described by the botanist Ludwig Diels in 1904 in his work with Georg August Pritzel, Fragmenta Phytographiae Australiae occidentalis. Beitrage zur Kenntnis der Pflanzen Westaustraliens, ihrer Verbreitung und ihrer Lebensverhaltnisse. Botanische Jahrbücher für Systematik, Pflanzengeschichte und Pflanzengeographie. This name is often misapplied to Gunniopsis calcarea.
