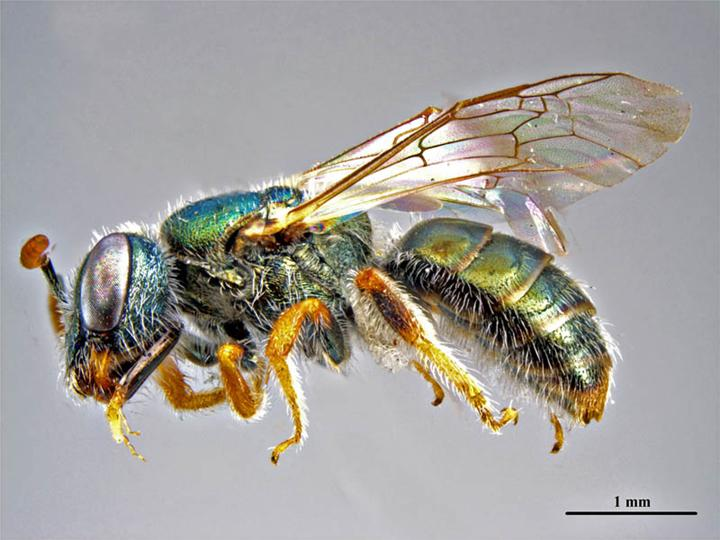
- Female

Scientific classification
- Kingdom: Animalia
- Phylum: Arthropoda
- Clade: Pancrustacea
- Class: Insecta
- Order: Hymenoptera
- Family: Halictidae
- Genus: Lasioglossum
- Species: L. florale

Binomial name
- Lasioglossum florale Smith, 1853

Synonyms
- Halictus floralis Smith, 1853; Halictus vividus Smith, 1879

= Lasioglossum florale =

Species of bee

Lasioglossum florale, or Lasioglossum (Chilalictus) florale, is a species of bee in the family Halictidae and subfamily Halictinae. It is endemic to Australia. It was described by English entomologist Frederick Smith in 1853.

== Distribution and habitat ==
The species occurs in parts of southern Australia. Type localities include Swan River.

== Behaviour ==
The adults are flying mellivores. Flowering plants visited by the bees include Aizoon, Amyema, Atalaya, Eremophila, Eucalyptus, Grevillea, Hakea, Lechenaultia, Leptospermum, Melaleuca, Myoporum, Nitraria, Scaevola and Westringia species.

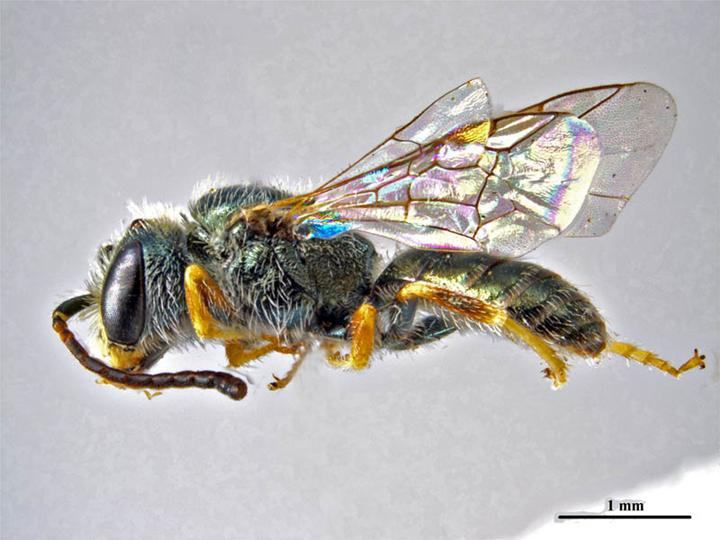
Male
