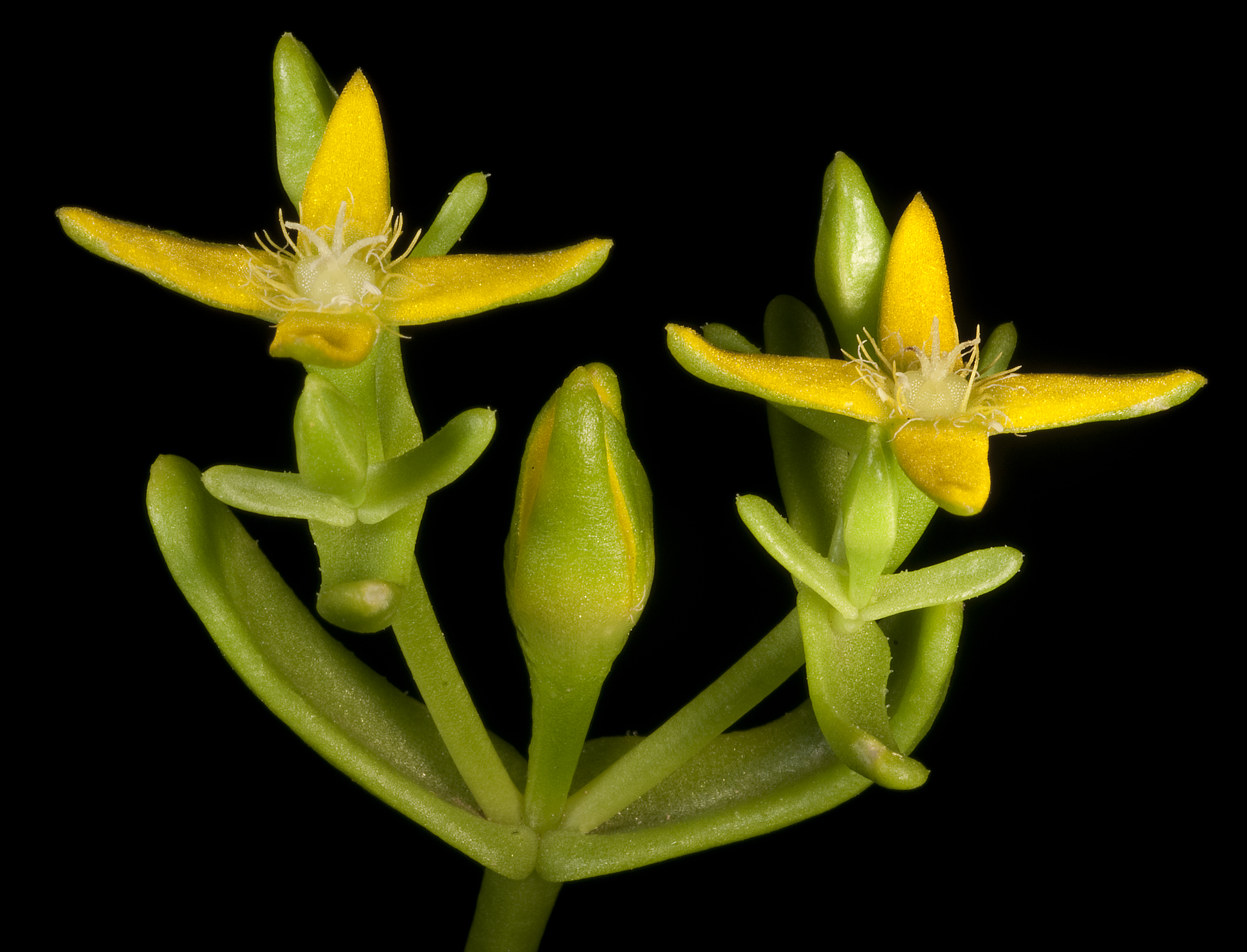
- Gunniopsis intermedia flower

Scientific classification
- Kingdom: Plantae
- Clade: Tracheophytes
- Clade: Angiosperms
- Clade: Eudicots
- Order: Caryophyllales
- Family: Aizoaceae
- Subfamily: Aizooideae
- Genus: Gunniopsis; Pax

Synonyms
- Gunnia F.Muell., nom. illeg.; Neogunnia Pax & K.Hoffm.

= Gunniopsis =

Genus of succulents

Gunniopsis is a genus of flowering plants in the iceplant family, Aizoaceae. These plants are found in areas of inland Australia.

Gunniopis comprises 14 species that were once members of the genera Aizoon, Gunnia and Neogunnia.

The name of the genus honours the botanist and politician Ronald Campbell Gunn. The genus was first formally described by the botanist Ferdinand Pax in 1889 in Engler and Prantl's work Die Naturlichen Pflanzenfamilien. The name is derived from the Greek word opsis meaning resembling which alludes to the resemblance of the genus to the genus Gunnia.

Members of this genus are succulents with the habit of a small shrub or herb.

The plants are widespread throughout the eremaean zones of Western Australia and South Australia with some species extending into the areas in the Northern Territory, Queensland and New South Wales. Found in arid areas the plants are often found in shrubland area with saline soils in and around salt lake systems. The shrub-like Gunniopsis quadrifida has the largest distribution of all the species.

== Species ==
The 14 recognised species belonging to the genus Gunniopsis are listed below:

- Gunniopsis calcarea Chinnock – Nullarbor gunniopsis or yellow-flowered pigface
- Gunniopsis calva Chinnock
- Gunniopsis divisa Chinnock
- Gunniopsis glabra (Ewart) C.A.Gardner
- Gunniopsis intermedia Diels – yellow salt star
- Gunniopsis kochii (R.Wagner) Chinnock – Koch's pigface
- Gunniopsis papillata Chinnock
- Gunniopsis propinqua Chinnock
- Gunniopsis quadrifida (F.Muell.) Pax – sturts pigface
- Gunniopsis rodwayi (Ewart) C.A.Gardner
- Gunniopsis rubra Chinnock
- Gunniopsis septifraga (F.Muell.) Chinnock – green pigface
- Gunniopsis tenuifolia Chinnock – narrow-leaf pigface
- Gunniopsis zygophylloides (F.Muell.) Diels – twin-leaf pigface
