= Peter Corlett =

Australian sculptor

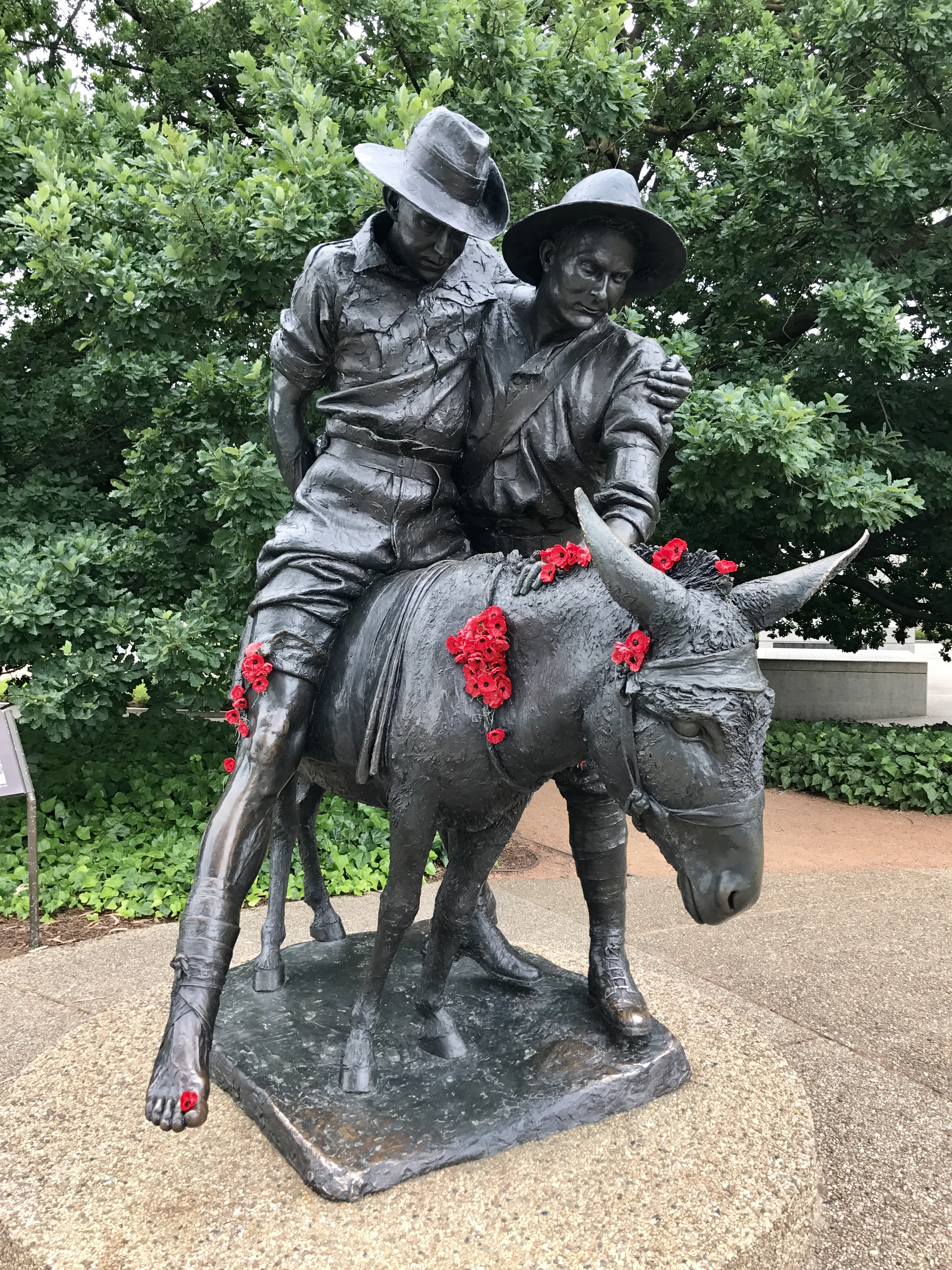
- Simpson and his donkey, 1915 by Peter Corlett
- Born: 1944 (age 81–82); Melbourne, Australia
- Education: RMIT University, Melbourne
- Known for: sculpture
- Website: www.petercorlett.com

Peter Corlett OAM (born 1944) is an Australian sculptor, known for his full-figure sculptures cast in bronze, especially his memorial works.

Corlett studied sculpture at RMIT University, Melbourne, from 1961 to 1964. In 1975, he was awarded a special projects grant from the Visual Arts Board of the Australia Council. Between 1977 and 1980, he was artist in residence at Exeter University and Exeter College of Art in the United Kingdom.

== Memorial works ==
In 1987, Corlett won a competition to create a memorial "to commemorate the courage and compassion" of John Simpson Kirkpatrick, a stretcher bearer during the Gallipoli Campaign in World War I. The result was a full size bronze sculpture, Simpson and his donkey, 1915, that now stands outside the Australian War Memorial in Canberra.

Cobbers is a full-size bronze sculpture created in 1998 for the Australian Memorial Park, near Fromelles in northern France. It depicts Sergeant Simon Fraser, a stretcher bearer with the 57th Battalion, rescuing a wounded compatriot from no man's land after the Battle of Fromelles (1916). The title comes from a letter that Fraser, a farmer from Byaduk, Victoria, wrote a few days after the battle and that was widely quoted in Australia's official history of World War I. In it, Fraser describes how one wounded soldier shouted out "Don't forget me, cobber." as he was helping another: Fraser went to get more stretcher bearers and both wounded soldiers were rescued. A replica of the sculpture is in the Shrine of Remembrance in Melbourne.

Corlett's other memorial works include:

- The Bullecourt Digger
- Memorial to the Australian Light Horse
- Man in the mud
- Sir Edward "Weary" Dunlop
- They also served, (Two WRANS 1941–1985)
- Edward 'Ted' Kenna VC

== Other works ==
Corlett has also created several sculptures of famous people associated with his native Melbourne, such as John Farnham, Kylie Minogue and Dame Nellie Melba. Several of these can be seen at Waterfront City in the Melbourne Docklands. He also produced a bronze sculpture of a Kelpie for the Victorian town of Casterton. He created the sculptures of former Victorian premiers at Treasury Gardens and has been commissioned to sculpt the controversial statue of Daniel Andrews.

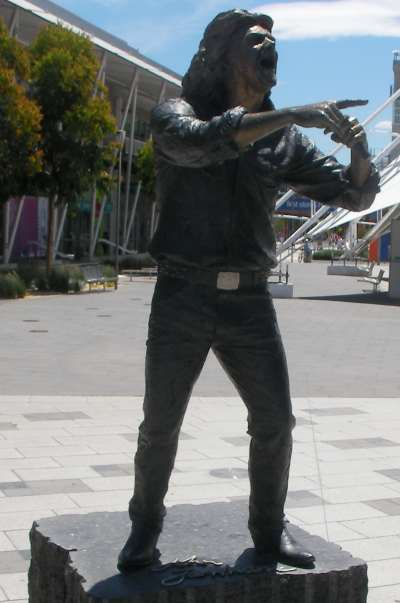
John Farnham

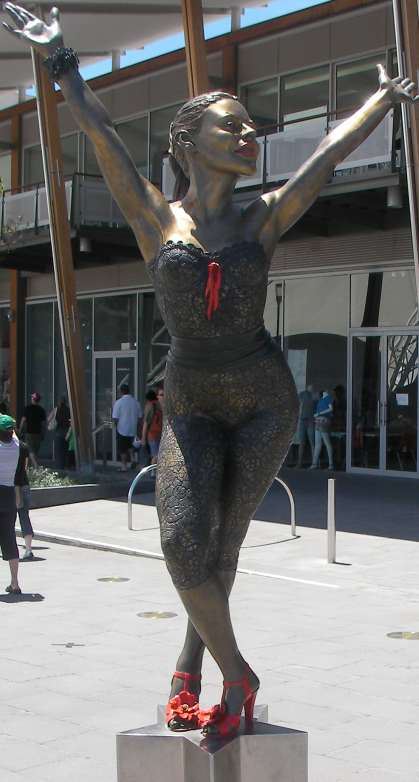
Kylie Minogue

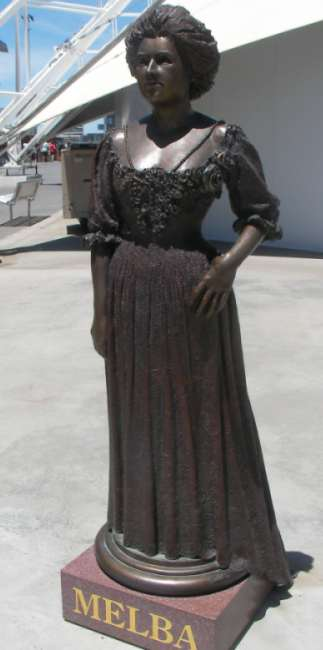
Dame Nellie Melba

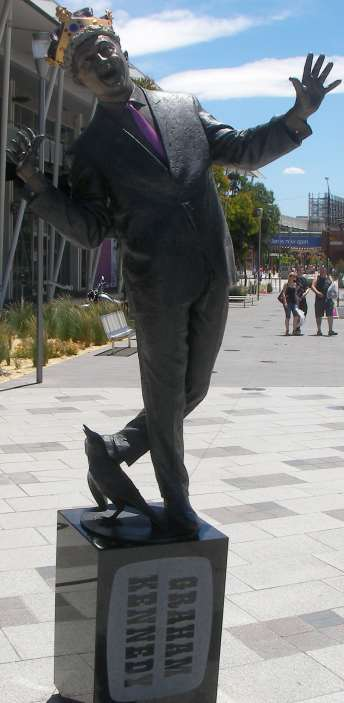
Graham Kennedy

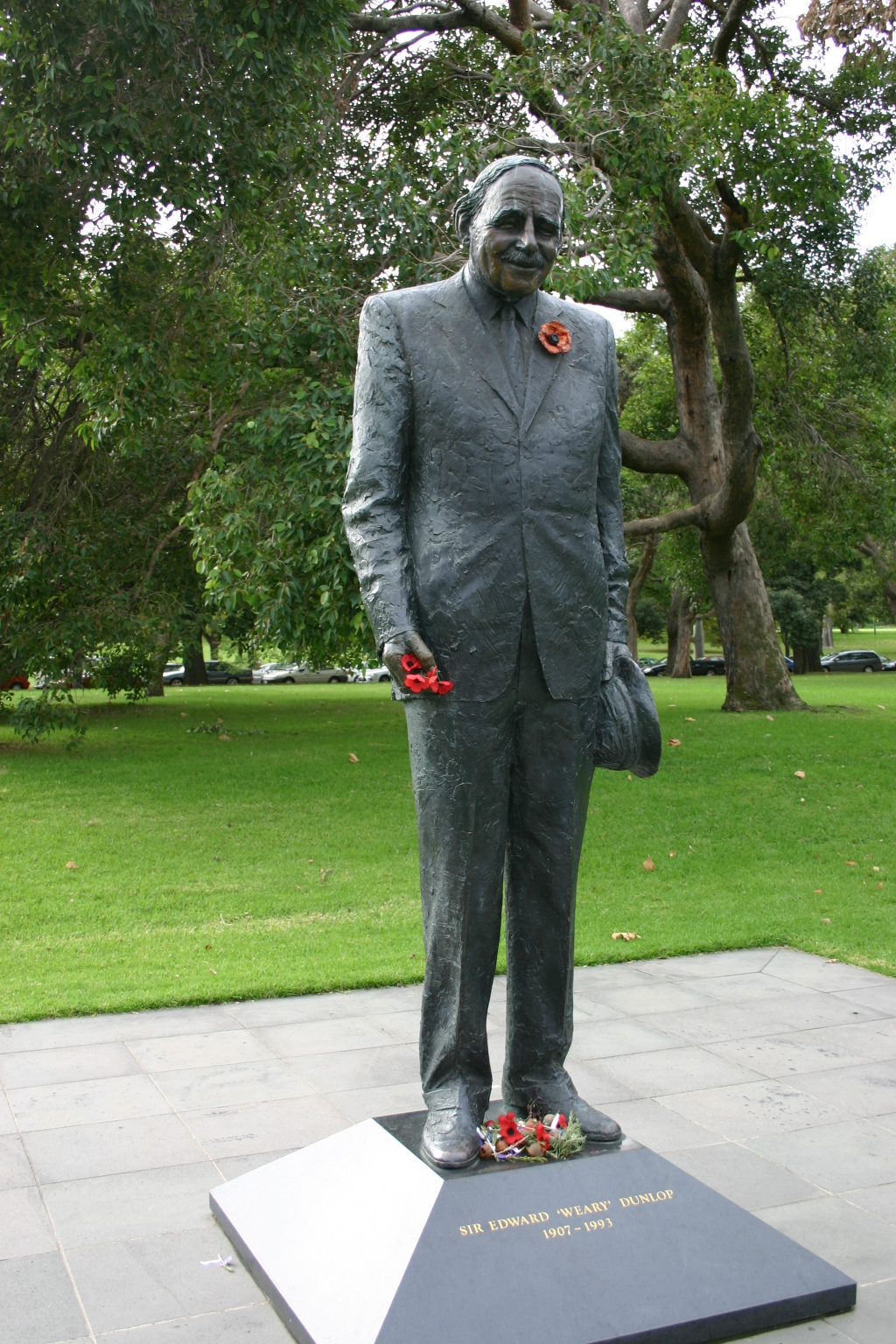
Edward "Weary" Dunlop, Royal Botanic Gardens, Melbourne

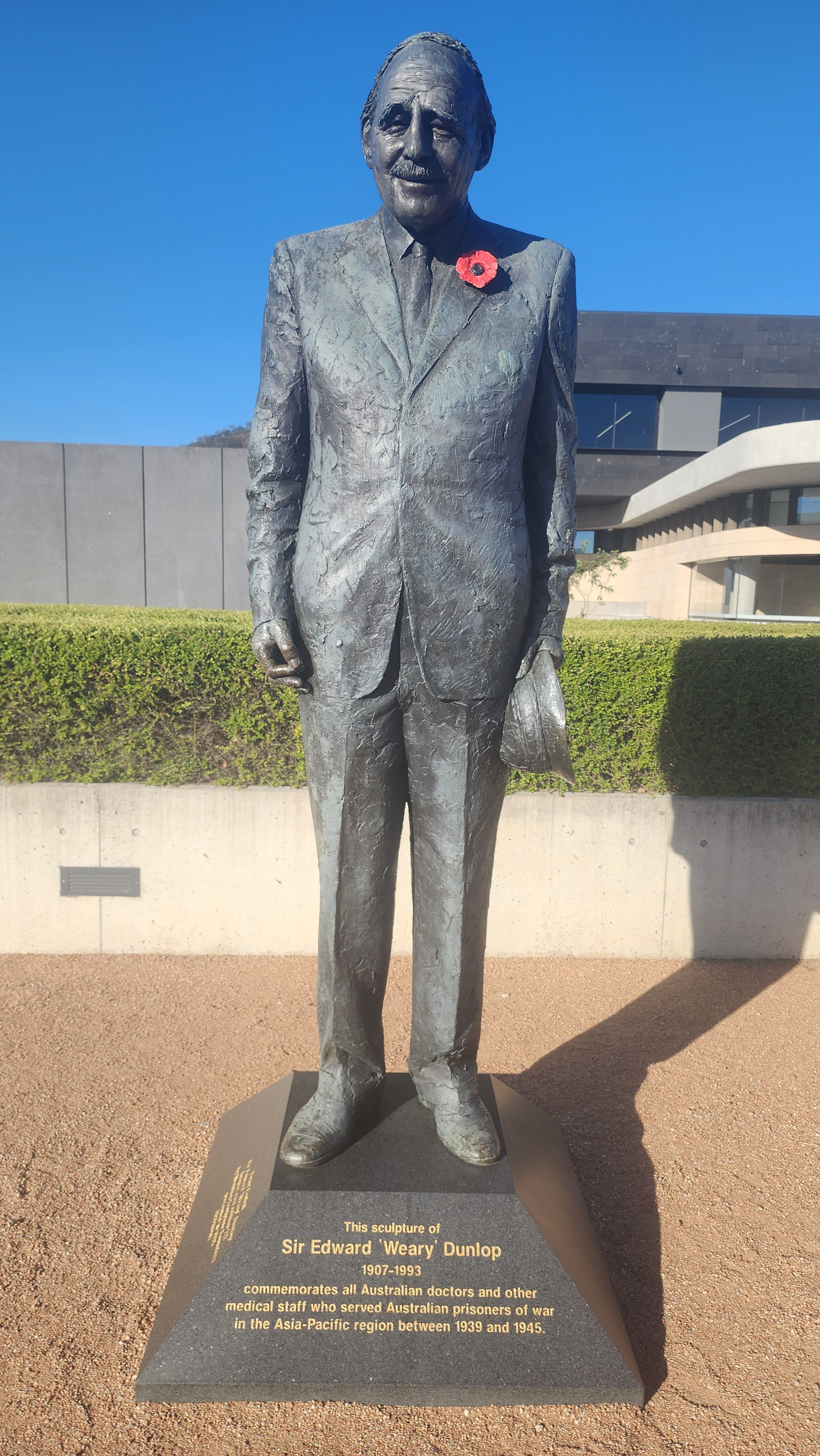
"Weary" Dunlop, 2nd of two, Australian War Memorial, Canberra

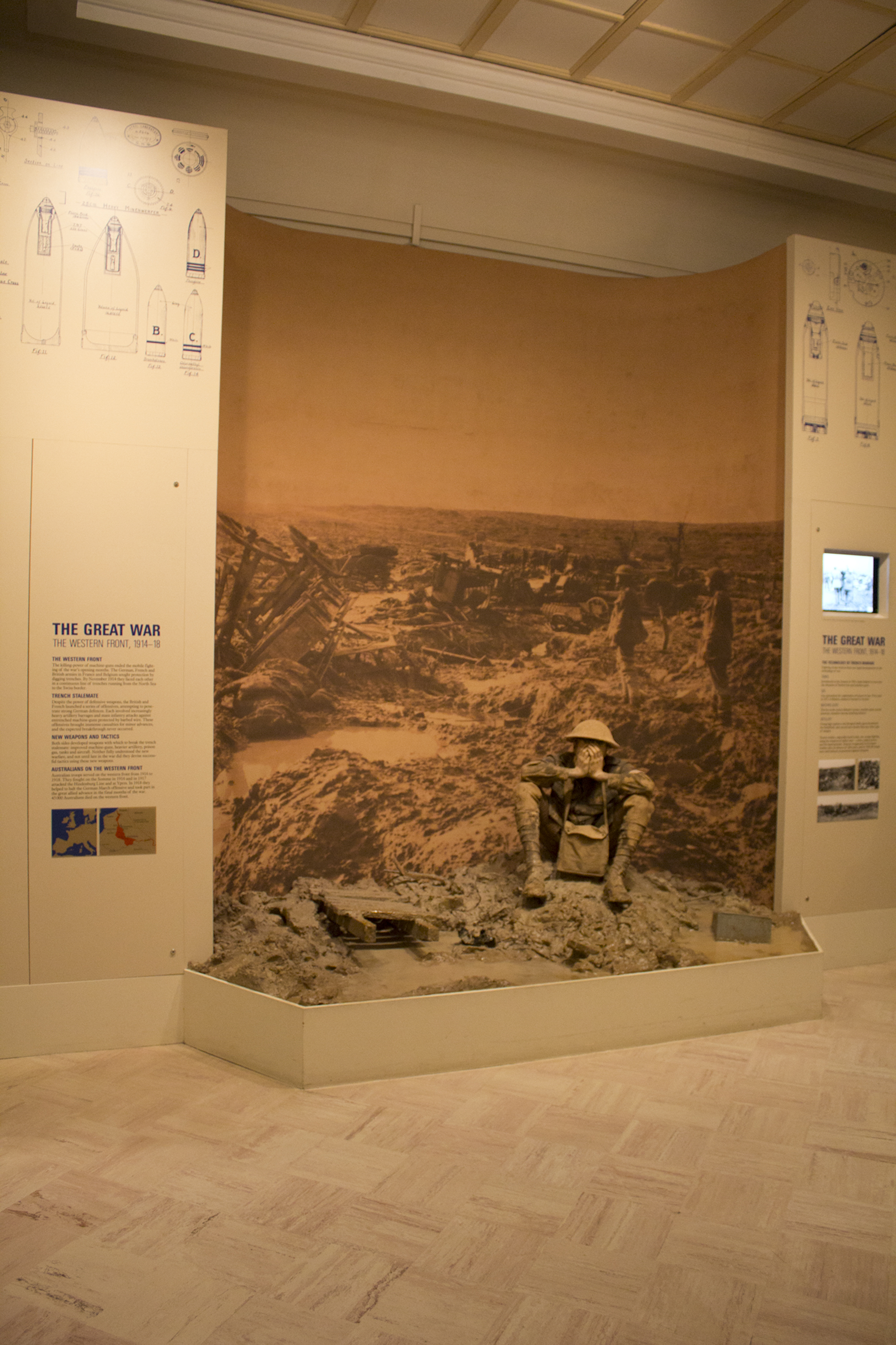
Man in the mud at the Australian War Memorial

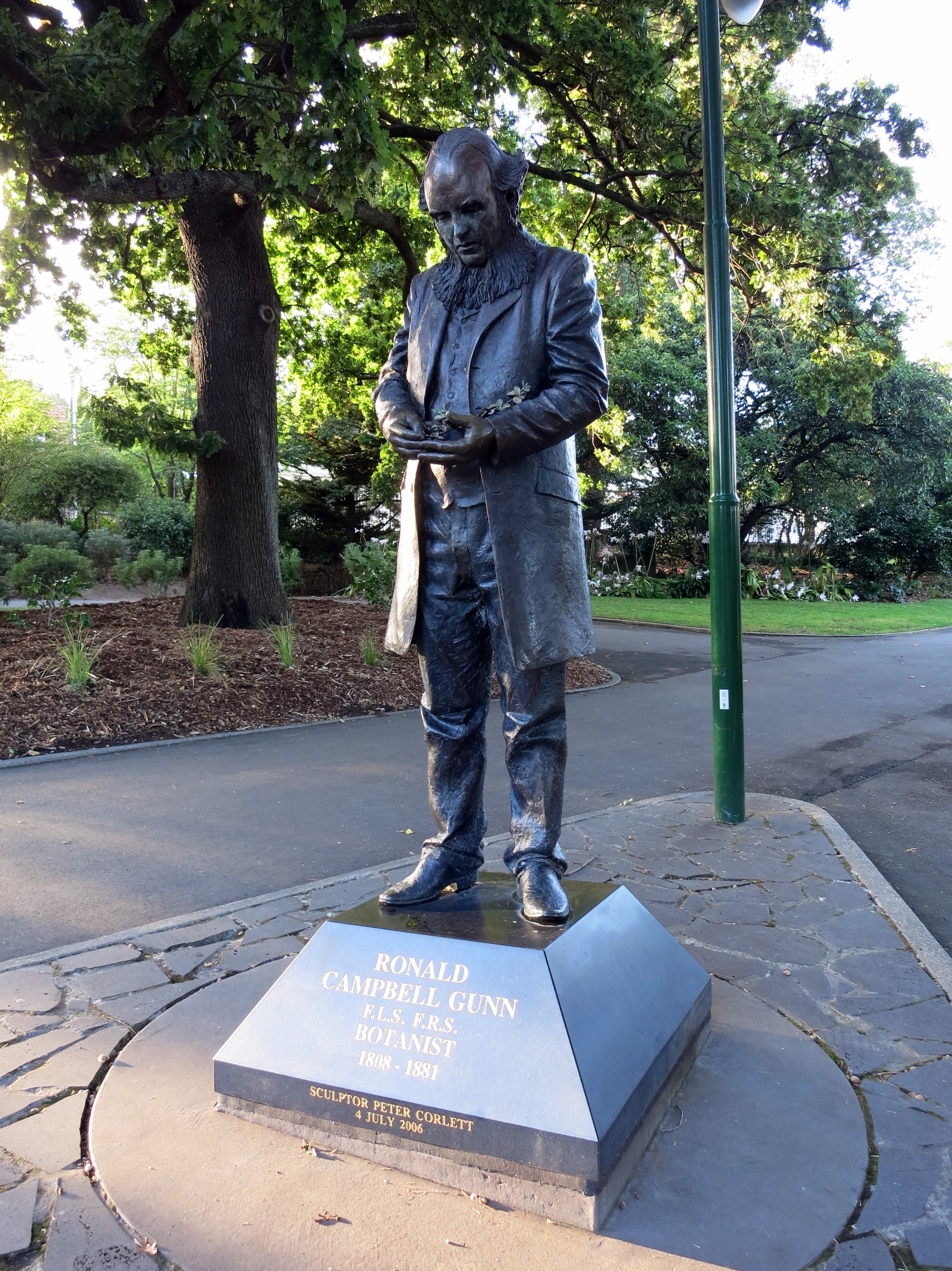
Ronald Campbell Gunn, City Park, Launceston, Tasmania

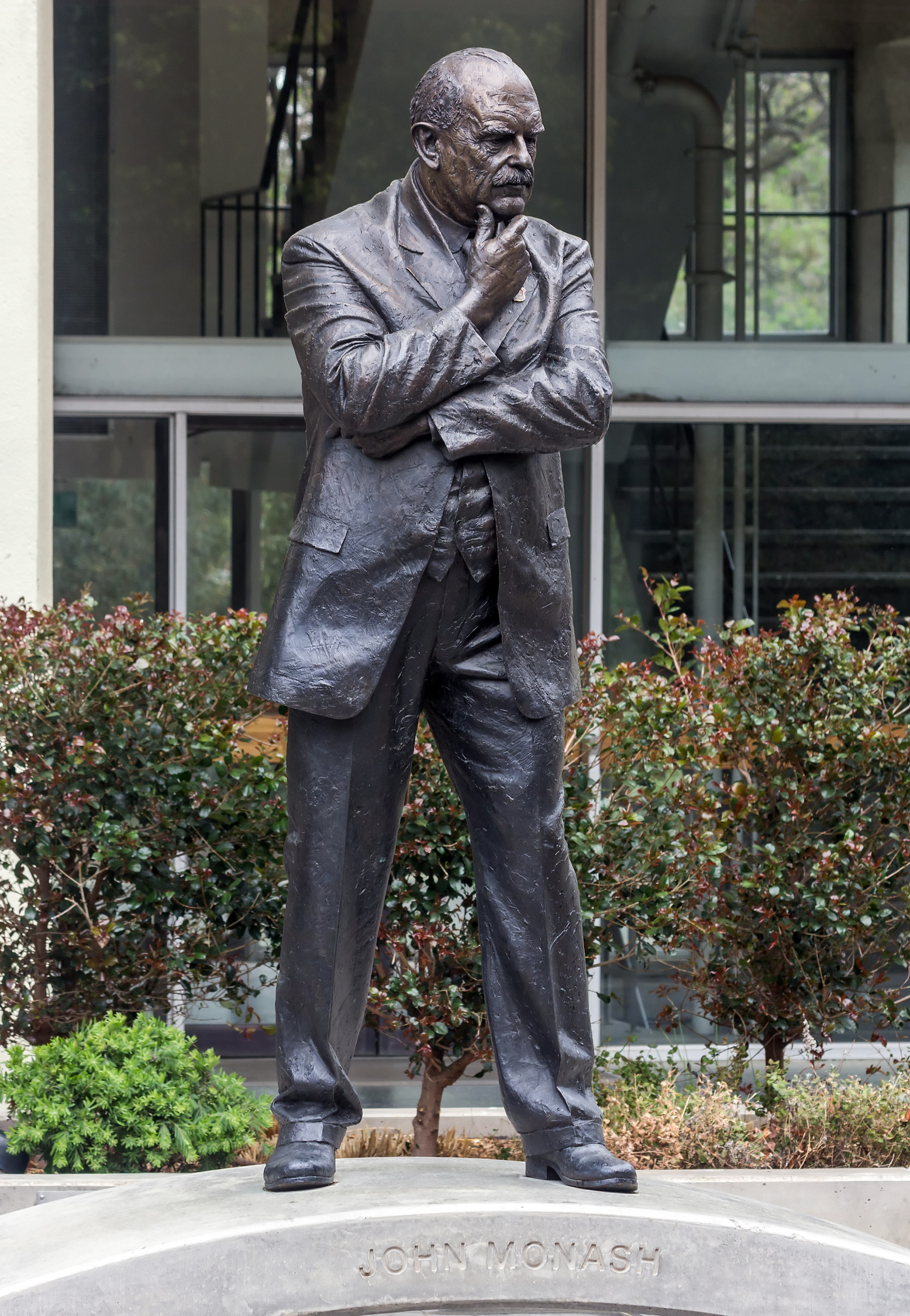
John Monash, Clayton Campus, Monash University
