= Aizoon pubescens =

Scientific classification
- Kingdom: Plantae
- Clade: Tracheophytes
- Clade: Angiosperms
- Clade: Eudicots
- Order: Caryophyllales
- Family: Aizoaceae
- Genus: Aizoon
- Species: A. pubescens

Binomial name
- Aizoon pubescens Eckl. & Zeyh. (1837)

Synonyms
- Galenia heterophylla Fenzl ex Sond. (1862); Galenia pubescens (Eckl. & Zeyh.) Druce (1916 publ. 1917); Galenia spathulata Fenzl ex Sond. (1862)

Species of succulent

Aizoon pubescens (Galenia or Coastal Galenia) is a low-growing perennial herb in the family Aizoaceae. It is native to South Africa (Cape Provinces, Free State, and Northern Provinces) and naturalised elsewhere.

== Description ==
The species is prostrate or decumbent, with ovate to spatulate leaves which are covered with hairs when young. The flowers are white with a slight pink tinge, and yellow with age. They are followed by capsules which contain shiny, black seeds, about 1 mm in length.

== Naturalisation ==
In Australia, the species is naturalised in Western Australia, South Australia, the Northern Territory, Tasmania, Victoria and New South Wales. In New South Wales, under the Noxious Weeds Act 1993, it is regarded as a noxious weed in the Liverpool Plains and Tamworth regions.

The species is disliked by some beekeepers. Although it produces nectar profusely and bees like it, the nectar makes honey taste slightly bitter.
