= Gunniopsis kochii =

Scientific classification
- Kingdom: Plantae
- Clade: Tracheophytes
- Clade: Angiosperms
- Clade: Eudicots
- Order: Caryophyllales
- Family: Aizoaceae
- Genus: Gunniopsis
- Species: G. kochii

Binomial name
- Gunniopsis kochii (R.Wagner) Chinnock

Species of plant

Gunniopsis kochii, commonly known as the Koch's pigface, is a succulent plant in the iceplant family, Aizoaceae. It is endemic to Australia.

The sparsely branching annual herb covered in papillose typically grows to a height of 20 centimetres (8 in). It has fleshy grey-green leaves that are ovate to oblanceolate in shape. Leaves are up to 30 mm (1.18 in) long and 11 mm (0.43 in). It blooms between September and October producing solitary purple and pink flowers.

The plant is found in stony areas like gibber plains. It is distributed through central parts of South Australia.

The species was first formally described as Aizoon kochii by the botanist R.Wagner in 1904 in his work Annalen des K. K. Naturhistorischen Hofmuseums. It was subsequently reclassified by Robert Chinnock in 1983 in the article The Australian genus Gunniopsis Pax (Aizoaceae) in the Journal of the Adelaide Botanic Gardens.
