= Gunniopsis calva =

Scientific classification
- Kingdom: Plantae
- Clade: Tracheophytes
- Clade: Angiosperms
- Clade: Eudicots
- Order: Caryophyllales
- Family: Aizoaceae
- Genus: Gunniopsis
- Species: G. calva

Binomial name
- Gunniopsis calva Chinnock

Species of plant

Gunniopsis calva, commonly known as the smooth pigface, is a succulent plant in the iceplant family, Aizoaceae. It is endemic to Australia.

The annual herb is glabrous and typically grows to a height of 20 centimetres (7.9 in). It has striated and terete branchlets. The succulent yellow-green leaves are ovate or oblong in shape, approximately 32 mm (1.3 in) long and 10 mm (0.39 in) wide. It blooms between August and October producing small yellow solitary flowers.

It is found around the margins of salt lakes in the area north of Port Augusta to central South Australia where it grows in sandy or clay soils.

The species was first formally described by Robert Chinnock in 1983 in the article The Australian genus Gunniopsis Pax (Aizoaceae) in the Journal of the Adelaide Botanic Gardens.
