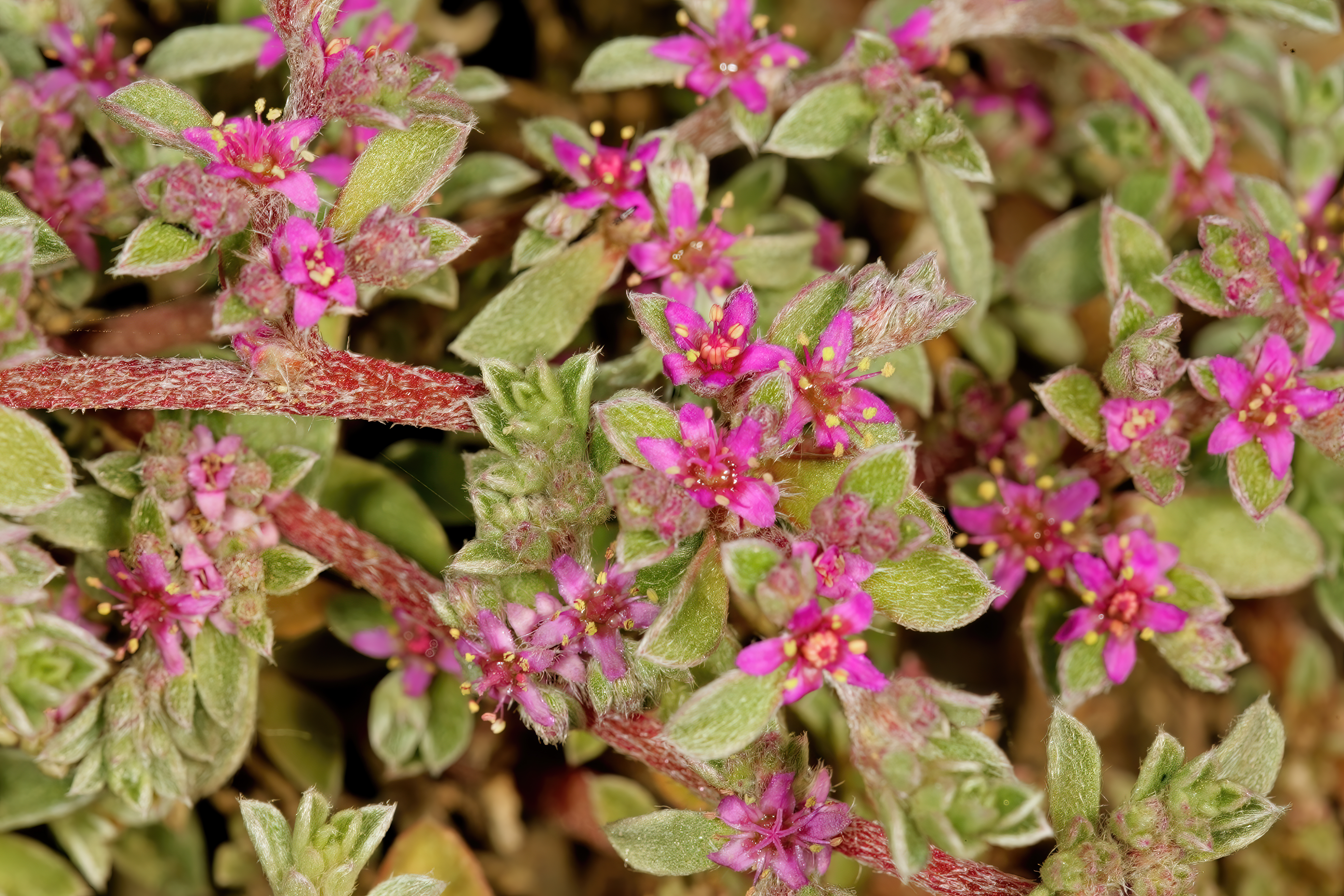

Scientific classification
- Kingdom: Plantae
- Clade: Tracheophytes
- Clade: Angiosperms
- Clade: Eudicots
- Order: Caryophyllales
- Family: Aizoaceae
- Genus: Aizoon
- Species: A. secundum

Binomial name
- Aizoon secundum L.f. (1782)

Synonyms
- Aizoon contaminatum Eckl. & Zeyh. (1837); Aizoon elongatum Eckl. & Zeyh. (1837); Aizoon glinoides Eckl. & Zeyh. (1837), nom. illeg.; Aizoon propinquum Eckl. & Zeyh. (1837); Galenia secunda (L.f.) Sond. (1862)

= Aizoon secundum =

Species of succulent

Aizoon secundum, the onesided galenia, is a species of flowering plant native to southern Africa, including Botswana, Namibia, and South Africa (Cape Provinces, Free State, and Northern Provinces). It is naturalized in Australia (Western Australia, Victoria, Tasmania and New South Wales), Spain, and the United States (Florida and New Jersey). In Spain and Australia, is considered an invasive weed threatening native vegetation.

Aizoon secundum is shrub or perennial herb with grayish-white stems that trail along the ground for as much as 60 cm, forming mats. Leaves are grayish-white, folded inward, up to 2.5 cm long. Flowers are small, white to yellowish, up to 2 mm in diameter, often hidden by the leaves.
