= Gunniopsis tenuifolia =

Scientific classification
- Kingdom: Plantae
- Clade: Tracheophytes
- Clade: Angiosperms
- Clade: Eudicots
- Order: Caryophyllales
- Family: Aizoaceae
- Genus: Gunniopsis
- Species: G. tenuifolia

Binomial name
- Gunniopsis tenuifolia Chinnock

Species of plant

Gunniopsis tenuifolia, commonly known as the narrow-leaf pigface, is a succulent plant in the iceplant family, Aizoaceae. It is endemic to Australia.

The perennial glabrous shrub has a rounded habit and typically grows to a height of 1 metre (3.3 ft). It has a reddish tinge to the branchlets. The terete yellow-green leaves are approximately 62 mm (2.4 in) long and 2 mm (0.08 in) wide. It blooms between August and January producing small green-yellow flowers.

It is found on rocky lopes of low hills, clay flats and depressions that flood periodically flooding usually in open mallee woodland areas in central South Australia, between Leigh Creek and Arckaringa where it grows in clay soils.

== Taxonomy and naming ==
The species was first formally described by Robert Chinnock in 1983 in the article The Australian genus Gunniopsis Pax (Aizoaceae) in the Journal of the Adelaide Botanic Gardens. The specific epithet (tenuifolia) is from Latin tenuifolius, meaning "slender-leaved".
