= Gunniopsis divisa =

Scientific classification
- Kingdom: Plantae
- Clade: Tracheophytes
- Clade: Angiosperms
- Clade: Eudicots
- Order: Caryophyllales
- Family: Aizoaceae
- Genus: Gunniopsis
- Species: G. divisa

Binomial name
- Gunniopsis divisa Chinnock

Species of succulent

Gunniopsis divisa is a succulent plant in the iceplant family, Aizoaceae. It is endemic to Western Australia.

The annual herb typically grows to a height of 0.05 to 0.1 metres (0.2 to 0.3 ft). It blooms between August and October producing white to yellow flowers. The base of the plant is often thickened. The green fleshy leaves are opposite.

It is found along roadsides inland from Geraldton in the Mid West region of Western Australia where it grows in loamy soils often over quartz.

The species was first formally described by Robert Chinnock in 1983 in the article The Australian genus Gunniopsis Pax (Aizoaceae) in the Journal of the Adelaide Botanic Gardens.
