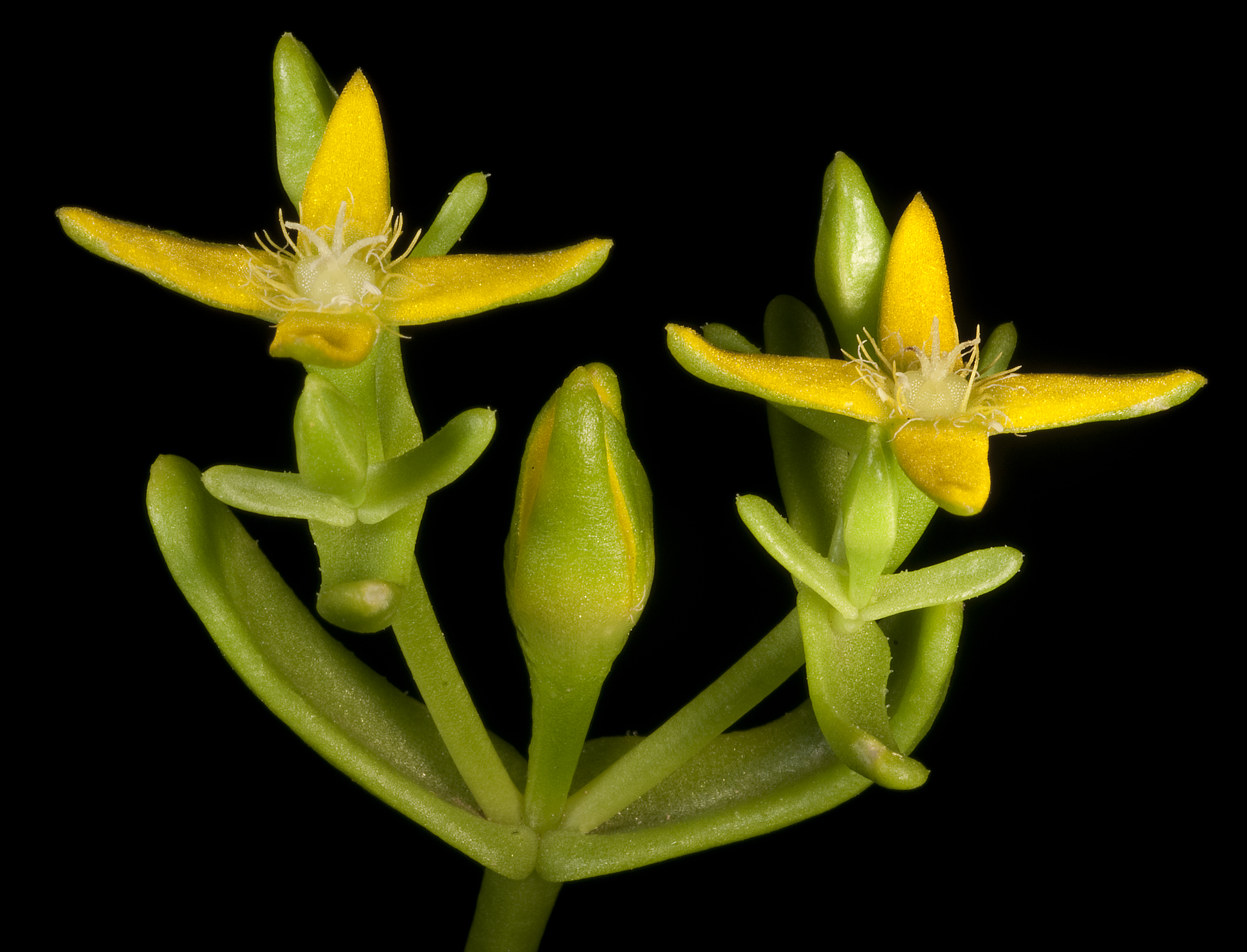
- Gunniopsis intermedia flower

Scientific classification
- Kingdom: Plantae
- Clade: Tracheophytes
- Clade: Angiosperms
- Clade: Eudicots
- Order: Caryophyllales
- Family: Aizoaceae
- Genus: Gunniopsis
- Species: G. intermedia

Binomial name
- Gunniopsis intermedia Diels

= Gunniopsis intermedia =

Species of succulent

Gunniopsis intermedia, commonly known as yellow salt star, is a succulent plant in the iceplant family, Aizoaceae. It is endemic to Australia.

The annual herb has an erect or prostrate habit typically growing to a height of 1 to 30 centimetres (0.4 to 11.8 in) and form a mound up to 0.5 metres (1.6 ft) across. The leaves are 2 to 7 cm (0.8 to 2.8 in) long and 2 to 3 cm (0.8 to 1.2 in) wide. It blooms from September to November producing yellow-white flowers.

It is found around salt lakes and on saline flats in inland areas of the Wheatbelt and Goldfields-Esperance regions of Western Australia where it grows in sandy, loam or clay soils.

The species was first formally described by the botanist Ludwig Diels in 1904 in the work Botanische Jahrbücher für Systematik, Pflanzengeschichte und Pflanzengeographie.
