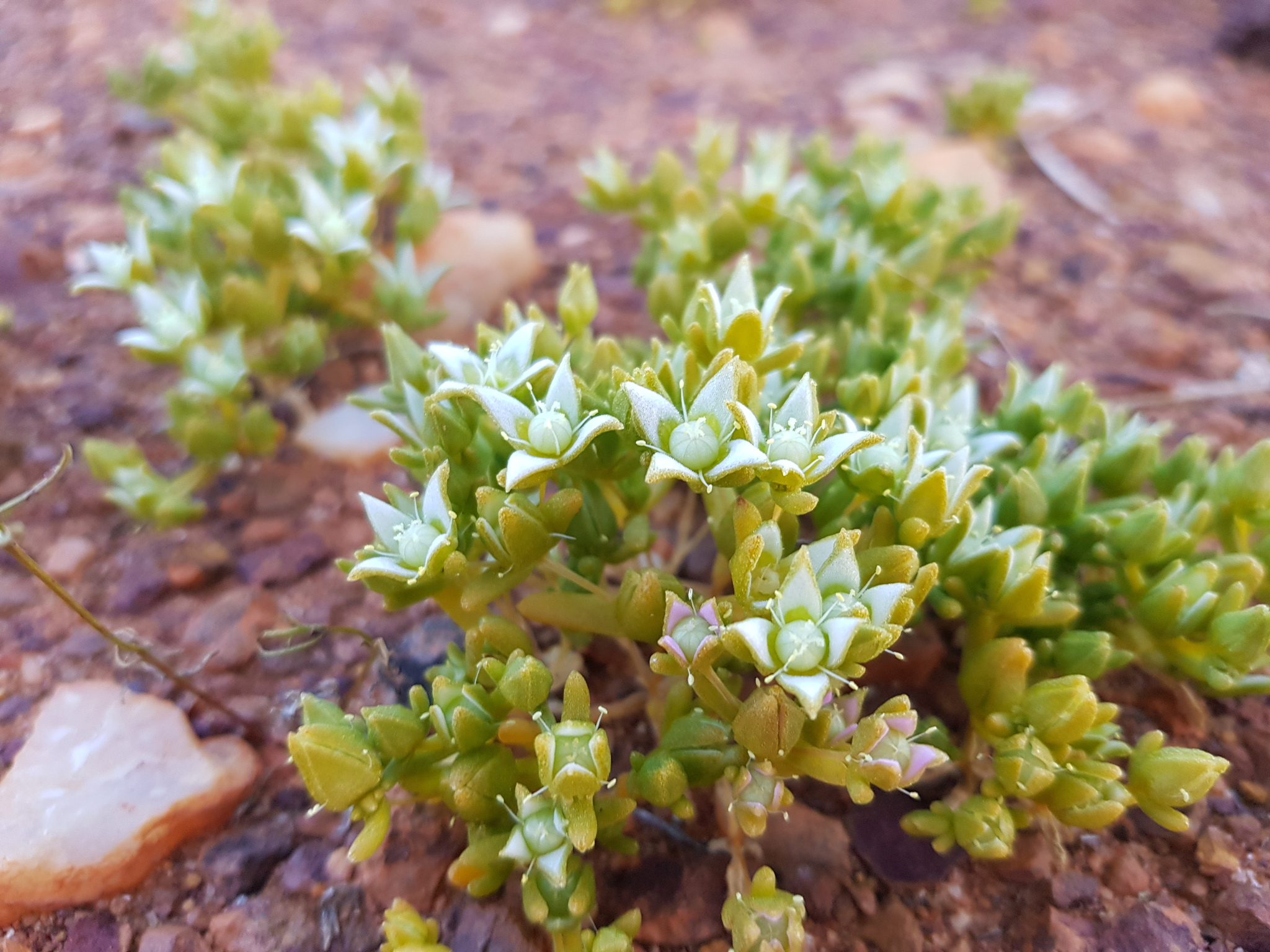

Scientific classification
- Kingdom: Plantae
- Clade: Tracheophytes
- Clade: Angiosperms
- Clade: Eudicots
- Order: Caryophyllales
- Family: Aizoaceae
- Genus: Gunniopsis
- Species: G. propinqua

Binomial name
- Gunniopsis propinqua Chinnock

= Gunniopsis propinqua =

Species of succulent

Gunniopsis propinqua is a species of succulent plant in the iceplant family, Aizoaceae. It is endemic to Western Australia.

== Description ==
The prostrate annual or perennial herb typically grows to a height of 0.03 to 0.1 metres (0.1 to 0.3 ft). It blooms between August and September producing white to pink flowers.

== Distribution and habitat ==
It is found among lateritic outcrops and winter wet area with scattered distribution in the Mid West, Goldfields-Esperance and Pilbara regions of Western Australia where it grows in stony, sandy or loamy soils.

== Taxonomy ==
The species was first formally described by Robert Chinnock in 1983 in the article The Australian genus Gunniopsis Pax (Aizoaceae) in the Journal of the Adelaide Botanic Gardens.
