= Gunniopsis calcarea =

Scientific classification
- Kingdom: Plantae
- Clade: Tracheophytes
- Clade: Angiosperms
- Clade: Eudicots
- Order: Caryophyllales
- Family: Aizoaceae
- Genus: Gunniopsis
- Species: G. calcarea

Binomial name
- Gunniopsis calcarea Chinnock

Species of succulent

Gunniopsis calcarea, commonly known as the Nullarbor Gunniopsis or the yellow flowered pigface, is a succulent plant in the iceplant family, Aizoaceae. It is endemic to Australia.

The shrub has an erect and spreading habit typically growing to a height of 0.1 to 0.3 metres (0.3 to 1.0 ft). It blooms between August and March producing yellow flowers. The leaves are bright green with a lanceolate shape and are covered in peltate scales as are the stems.

It is found in tight colonies along roadsides and in depressions in coastal areas of the Goldfields-Esperance region of Western Australia where it grows in sandy, loam or clay soils often over limestone. It is also found in coastal areas in western South Australia. Often found in association with Halosarcia and Maireana species and in open and low mallee-Melaleuca scrubland.

The species was first formally described as Aizoon zygophylloides by the botanist Ferdinand von Mueller in 1871 in the work Fragmenta Phytographiae Australiae . Ludwig Diels reclassified the plant as Gunniopsis zygophylloides in 1904. It was reclassified again by Robert Chinnock in 1983 in the article The Australian genus Gunniopsis Pax (Aizoaceae) in the Journal of the Adelaide Botanic Gardens.
