= Gunniopsis glabra =

Scientific classification
- Kingdom: Plantae
- Clade: Tracheophytes
- Clade: Angiosperms
- Clade: Eudicots
- Order: Caryophyllales
- Family: Aizoaceae
- Genus: Gunniopsis
- Species: G. glabra

Binomial name
- Gunniopsis glabra (Ewart) C.A.Gardner

Species of succulent

Gunniopsis glabra is a succulent plant in the iceplant family, Aizoaceae. It is endemic to Western Australia.

The perennial herb with a woody base typically grows to a height of 1 to 8 centimetres (0.4 to 3.1 in). It blooms between October and February producing white flowers.

It is found around salt lakes and was a scattered distribution throughout the Mid West, Wheatbelt and Goldfields-Esperance regions of Western Australia where it grows in sandy and sometimes loamy soils.

The species was first formally as Aizoon glabra by the botanist Alfred James Ewart in 1908 in his work Contributions to the Flora of Australia as recorded in Proceedings of the Royal Society of Victoria. Gardner reclassified it into the Gunniopsis genera in 1930 in the work Enumeratio Plantarum Australiae Occidentalis.
