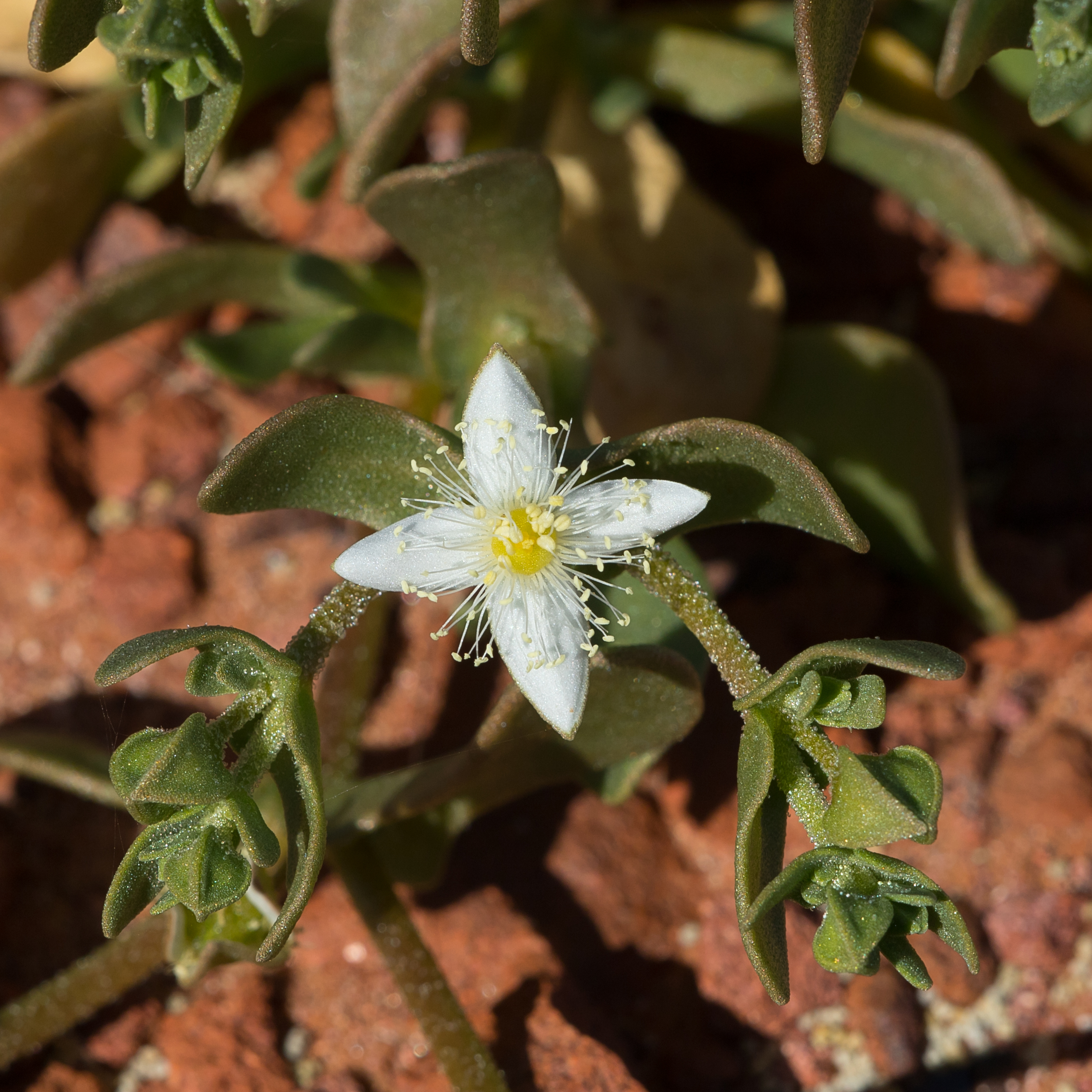
- Near Winton

Scientific classification
- Kingdom: Plantae
- Clade: Tracheophytes
- Clade: Angiosperms
- Clade: Eudicots
- Order: Caryophyllales
- Family: Aizoaceae
- Genus: Gunniopsis
- Species: G. papillata

Binomial name
- Gunniopsis papillata Chinnock

Synonyms
- Aizoon zygophylloides auct. non F.Muell.: Black, J.M. (1948)

= Gunniopsis papillata =

Twin-leaved pigface

Species of plant

Gunniopsis papillata, commonly known as the twin-leaved pigface, is a species of succulent plant in the iceplant family, Aizoaceae and is endemic to inland areas of Australia. It is an annual herb with pimply, spatula-shaped to egg-shaped leaves and flowers with white or yellow petals.

== Description ==
Gunniopsis papillata is an annual herb that typically grows to a height of 20 cm (7.9 in) with cylindrical branchlets. The branchlets and leaves are usually covered with pimply or nipple-like projections. The leaves are spatula-shaped to egg-shaped, yellowish to greyish green, about 30 mm (1.2 in) long and 10 mm (0.39 in) wide. The flowers are arranged singly with white or yellow, rarely pink, egg-shaped to triangular petals 4.5–9.5 mm (0.18–0.37 in) long, 2.3–4.9 mm (0.091–0.193 in) wide that are green and pimply on the back. There are many stamens arranged in two or three whorls. Flowering occurs from August to October.

== Taxonomy ==
Gunniopsis papillata was first formally described in 1983 by Robert Chinnock from specimens collected near Curdamurka (west of Lake Eyre) by Joseph Zvonko Weber in 1978.

== Distribution and habitat ==
Twin-leaved pigface is found long ephemeral creek beds, swales and in depressions on gibber flats in saline areas, mainly through central and northern parts of South Australia where it grows in loam or clay soils. It also occurs in the south west of Queensland, north-western inland New South Wales, and there are also old records from the south of the Northern Territory where the species is listed as "near threatened" under the Territory Parks and Wildlife Conservation Act.
