= Man in the mud =

1989 diorama of an Australian WWI soldier by Peter Corlett

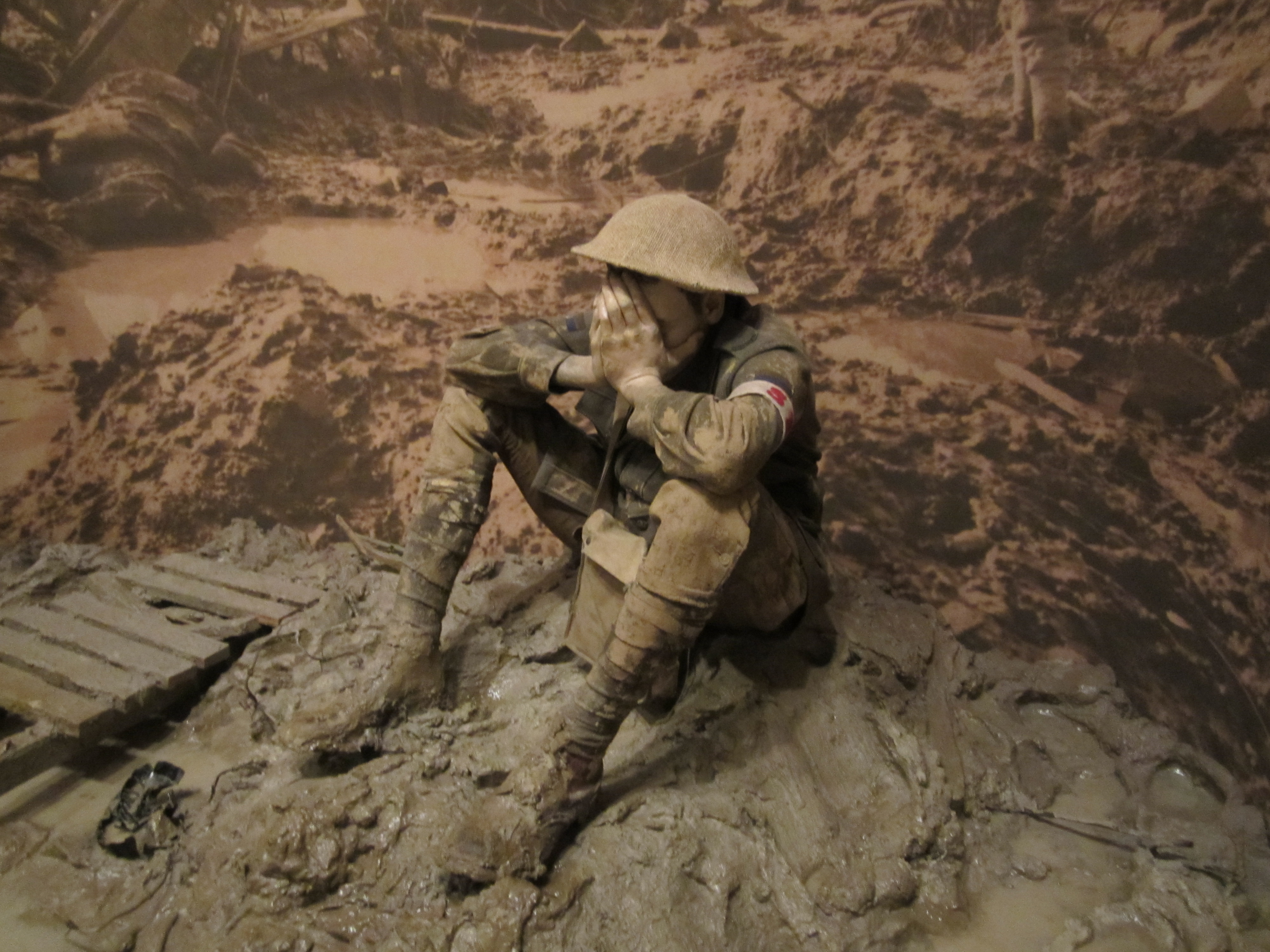
- Artist: Peter Corlett
- Year: 1989
- Medium: Fibreglass with wood, fabric and metal objects
- Accession: 1989
- Website: AWM collection record

Man in the mud is a diorama by Peter Corlett which forms part of the collection of the Australian War Memorial (AWM). It depicts an Australian soldier of World War I sitting on a muddy battlefield in France. The diorama was commissioned by the AWM in 1986, and was placed on display in 1989. Man in the mud is popular with visitors to the Memorial, and remained on display after the AWM's World War I galleries were closed for major renovations in 2013.

== Design and construction ==
In 1986 the Australian War Memorial commissioned Corlett to produce a diorama which depicted the difficult conditions endured by the Australian soldiers who fought on the Western Front during World War I. Corlett selected a pose for the subject of the diorama from that of a soldier in a photo in the AWM's collection which depicts a group of gassed Australians at a casualty clearing station in France during May 1918.

The diorama was designed using a live model, who Corlett photographed replicating the pose in the AWM photo. Corlett subsequently slightly altered the pose, however, to increase the tension of the soldier's body. The figure and the mud in which he is seated are crafted from fibreglass. The soldier wears a fibre uniform and metal helmet, and the diorama's backing is a brown-toned photograph of a muddy battlefield.

In his book Peter Corlett : sculptures, Patrick Hutchings provides the following description of Man in the mud:

The diorama consists of a very large, curved photomural of a desolate landscape of guns, broken equipment and mud. Mud is everywhere. The foreground is a muck heap of mud, a broken duckboard and polluted water, marvellously realised in fibreglass and (for the water) clear polyester resin mixes, tinted variously and swirled together. On a little hummock sits a soldier in deep despair, elbows on knees, his face in his hands. The figure is in entirely correct historical uniform and forms part of a very convincing diorama. It also alludes, in its body language, to the eschatological figure of Michelangelo's Last Judgement in the Sistine Chapel.

== Reception ==
Man in the mud was completed in 1989, and placed on display in the AWM's World War I galleries that year. As of 2005, the diorama was located immediately after the exit of the Memorial's gallery on the Gallipoli Campaign, and was the first item visitors saw when they entered the Western Front galleries. This placement was intended to stress the more impersonal and brutal nature of the fighting in France compared to that in Gallipoli. A 1988 Canberra Times article labelled the then-incomplete diorama "very fine". Hutchings also judged the work to be a success.

The diorama is one of the most popular items on display in the AWM, and the Memorial's website labels it "much-loved". Responding to the realistic appearance of the soldier and the muddy battlefield, many of the memorial's visitors touch the work.

Man in the mud was removed from the AWM's World War I galleries when they were closed for a major redevelopment in April 2013. It was placed on display in the Memorial's temporary exhibition space. The statue was not included in the World War I galleries after they re-opened.
