= Gunniopsis rodwayi =

Scientific classification
- Kingdom: Plantae
- Clade: Tracheophytes
- Clade: Angiosperms
- Clade: Eudicots
- Order: Caryophyllales
- Family: Aizoaceae
- Genus: Gunniopsis
- Species: G. rodwayi

Binomial name
- Gunniopsis rodwayi (Ewart) C.A.Gardner

Species of succulent

Gunniopsis rodwayi is a succulent plant in the iceplant family, Aizoaceae. It is endemic to Western Australia.

The annual herb can have an erect or prostrate habit typically growing to a height of 1 to 20 centimetres (0.4 to 7.9 in). It blooms between August and December producing white flowers.

It is found around salt lakes and other saline areas and was a scattered distribution throughout the Mid West, Wheatbelt and Goldfields-Esperance regions of Western Australia where it grows in sandy, loamy or clay soils.

The species was first formally as Aizoon rodwayi by the botanist Alfred James Ewart in 1908 in his work Contributions to the Flora of Australia as recorded in Proceedings of the Royal Society of Victoria. Gardner reclassified it into the Gunniopsis genera in 1930 in the work Enumeratio Plantarum Australiae Occidentalis.
