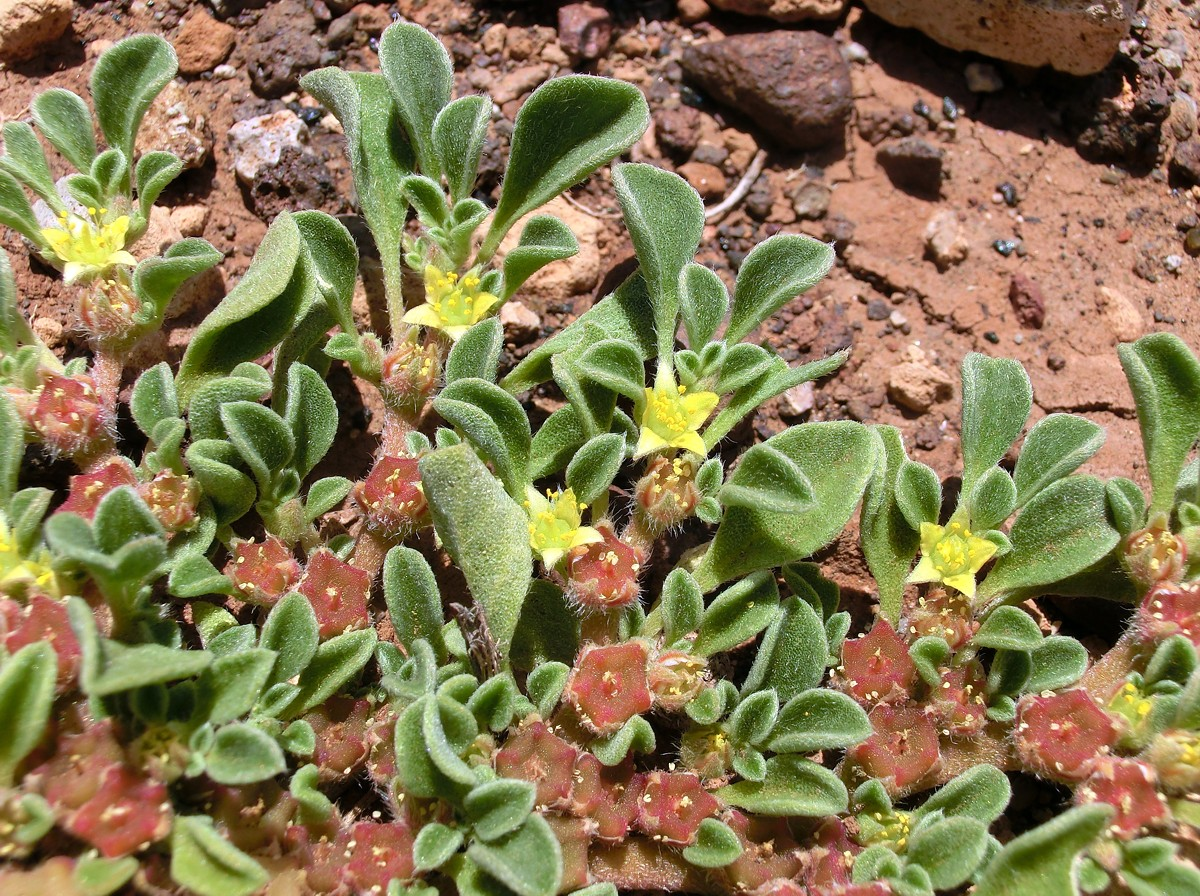

Scientific classification
- Kingdom: Plantae
- Clade: Tracheophytes
- Clade: Angiosperms
- Clade: Eudicots
- Order: Caryophyllales
- Family: Aizoaceae
- Genus: Aizoon
- Species: A. canariense

Binomial name
- Aizoon canariense L.

Synonyms
- Aizoon canariense var. denudata Sond.; Aizoon procumbens Crantz; Glinus chrystallinus Forssk.

= Aizoon canariense =

Species of succulent

Aizoon canariense is a species of small leafy annual plant in the family Aizoaceae.

== Description ==
The plant can grow up to 25 centimetres (10 in) tall. Its branches spread on the ground, its leaves are petiolate, somewhat fleshy and hairy. It has small flowers with 1–3 millimetres (1/16–1/8 in) long sepals, yellowish inside, and no petals.

== Distribution and habitat ==
The plant can be found in warm arid to semi-arid areas including Macaronesia (on Madeira, Canary Islands and Cape Verde), Arabia, Pakistan, North Africa and Southern Africa.

== Uses ==
Bedouins of Egypt made a gruel from the ground seeds and the leaves are locally consumed in times of famine.
