= Gunniopsis rubra =

Scientific classification
- Kingdom: Plantae
- Clade: Tracheophytes
- Clade: Angiosperms
- Clade: Eudicots
- Order: Caryophyllales
- Family: Aizoaceae
- Genus: Gunniopsis
- Species: G. rubra

Binomial name
- Gunniopsis rubra Chinnock

Species of succulent

Gunniopsis rubra is a succulent plant in the iceplant family, Aizoaceae. It is endemic to Western Australia.

The prostrate annual herb typically grows to a height of 1 to 3 centimetres (0.4 to 1.2 in). It blooms in September producing green flowers.

It is found in inland areas of the Mid West and Wheatbelt regions of Western Australia where it grows in loamy soils.

The species was first formally described by Robert Chinnock in 1983 in the article The Australian genus Gunniopsis Pax (Aizoaceae) in the Journal of the Adelaide Botanic Gardens.
