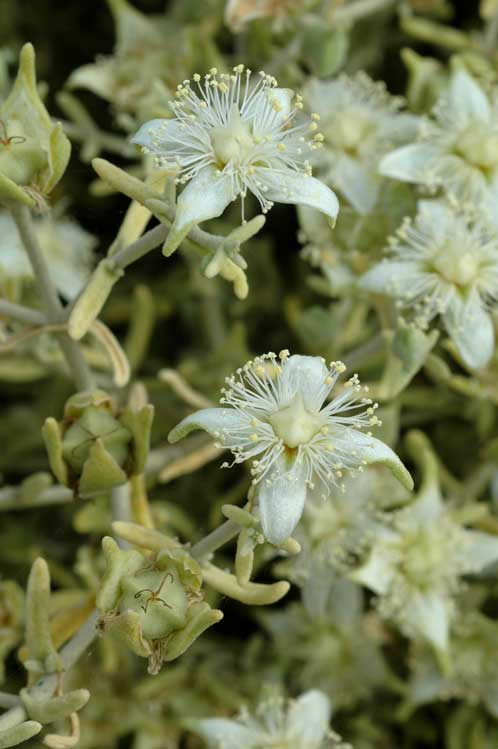

Scientific classification
- Kingdom: Plantae
- Clade: Tracheophytes
- Clade: Angiosperms
- Clade: Eudicots
- Order: Caryophyllales
- Family: Aizoaceae
- Genus: Gunniopsis
- Species: G. quadrifida

Binomial name
- Gunniopsis quadrifida (F.Muell.) Pax

= Gunniopsis quadrifida =

Sturts pigface

Species of succulent

Gunniopsis quadrifida commonly known as Sturts pigface, is a flowering plant in the family Aizoaceae. This family consists of a diverse array of species that inhabit arid and/or saline coastal and inland areas, with the plants displaying leaf morphology that is conducive to such harsh environments. Typical features of members of this genus that lie within this family of succulents includes the presence of fleshy-leaves that acts as a water reservoir for the plant with the habit of a smalls shrub.

== Description ==
Gunniopsis quadrifida, commonly known as sturts pigface, is a succulent plant in the iceplant family, Aizoaceae. It is endemic to Australia.

The shrub has a divaricate, compact and rounded habit typically growing to a height of 0.2 to 1 metre (0.7 to 3.3 ft) with leaves that are about 8 centimetres (3.1 in) long.

Documented cases of the western distribution of the plant flowering have been noted to occur from August to January with the plant producing white flowers with a diameter of approximately 4 cm (1.6 in). Southern distributions have been noted to flower through the year with the appearance of the seeds being a black kidney-shaped object that can be up to 1.5 mm and covered in round tubercule's

== Ecology ==
It is found around salt lakes and on saline flats in inland areas of the Wheatbelt, Mid West and Goldfields-Esperance regions of Western Australia where it grows in sandy, loam or clay soils. It is also found in inland areas of the Northern Territory, South Australia, Queensland and New South Wales.

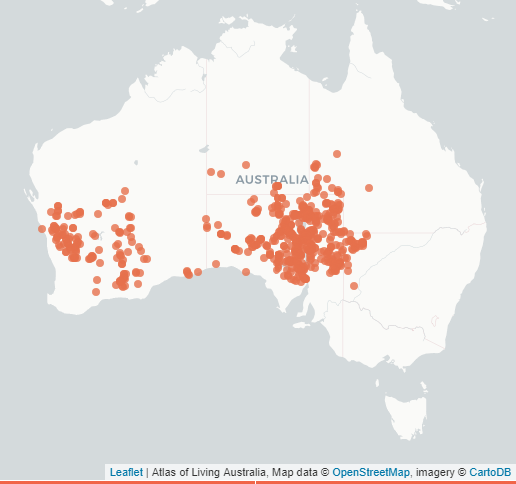
Map of recorded Sturt pigface distributions across Australia (905 on record)

The habitat includes the margins of salt lakes and clay pans with plants being seen to grow in sandy, clay or loamy soil conditions.

With specific locations of distribution including the:

· Beard's Provinces: Eremaean Province, South-West Province.

· IBRA Regions: Avon Wheatbelt, Coolgardie, Gascoyne, Geraldton Sandplains, Mallee, Murchison, Yalgoo.

· IBRA Subregions: Avon Wheatbelt P1, Carnegie, Eastern Goldfield, Eastern Mallee, Eastern Murchison, Geraldton Hills, Southern Cross, Tallering, Western Mallee, Western Murchison.

· Local Government Areas (LGAs): Coolgardie, Coorow, Cue, Dalwallinu, Dowerin, Dundas, Esperance, Greater Geraldton, Kalgoorlie-Boulder, Kondinin, Koorda, Laverton, Leonora, Menzies, Mingenew, Morawa, Mount Marshall, Murchison, Perenjori, Sandstone, Three Springs, Westonia, Wiluna, Yalgoo.

It is also distributed amongst the inland areas of the Northern Territory, Queensland, New South Wales and the northern half of South Australia. The Sturt's Pigface is listed as near threatened with rare sightings at the Northern Territory, Queensland and New South Wales and is more commonly documented to be present in the northern parts of South Australia and Western Australia.

== Taxonomy ==
The species was first formally described as Sesuvium quadrifidum by the botanist Ferdinand von Mueller in 1859 in the work Report on the Plants Collected During Mr. Babbage's Expedition into the North West Interior of South Australia in 1858. It was reclassified by von Mueller in 1861 as Aizoon quadrifidum and then again in 1889 by Ferdinand Albin Pax to the genus Gunniopsis in the Prantl and Engler's work Die Naturlichen Pflanzenfamilien.

Closely related species

There are 14 species that comprise the genus of Gunniopis that were once members of the genera Aizoon, Gunnia and Neogunnia all of which share similar plant morphology driven by evolutionary forces that allow the species to adapt to the arid and saline environments. The name is derived from the Greek word opsis meaning resembling which alludes to the resemblance of the genus to the genus Gunnia

Specially, the 14 recognized species includes:

· Gunniopsis divisa

· Gunniopsis glabra

· Gunniopsis intermedia

· Gunniopsis kochii

· Gunniopsis papillata

· Gunniopsis propinqua

· Gunniopsis quadrifida

· Gunniopsis rodwayi

· Gunniopsis rubra

· Gunniopsis septifraga

· Gunniopsis tenuifolia

· Gunniopsis zygophylloides

· Gunniopsis calcarea Chinnock

· Gunniopsis calva

With Gunniopsis quadrifida being the most common and widespread of the species

== Conservational importance ==
The human population is continuing to expand, and with it, the negative consequences such as habitat fragmentation, invasive species and climate change associated with the increase in land use for development and agricultural purposes, these negative impacts can all contribute to the decline of ecosystem functions, and threaten existing species that inhabit that environment.

The Gunniopsis quadrifida population has already been seen to be reduced in its distribution across inland NSW, NT and QLD. This reduction of the population can be due to anthropogenic causes such as targeted exploitation (from illegal harvesting) or more likely due to habitat degradation associated with intensified land-use both aspects of which have been seen to play a role in reducing the biodiversity of floral species when compared to the levels present pre-European settlement.

Australia is a country displaying a high-rate of population growth amongst other similar international countries with more than a third of its growth originating amongst the four cities consisting of Sydney, Perth, Brisbane and Melbourne.

Although the majority of population growth is centered on urban areas, through technological advancement driven by an increased need for land required for housing/agriculture akin to the development of metropolitan areas amidst the Mojave desert, the arid landscapes of which the Sturt Pigface currently inhabit in the relative absence of human interaction may be threatened in the future.

As various desert animals depend upon the Sturt Pigface for food/shelter, a shift in phenology (which is a common occurrence due to climate change), the interactions between this plant/animal dependence and as such it is important to survey and monitor the Sturt Pigfaces' in order to preserve the animal species that utilize the plant as a resource, as well as any potential invasive species that may compete with the plant which can increase its susceptibility to extinction.
