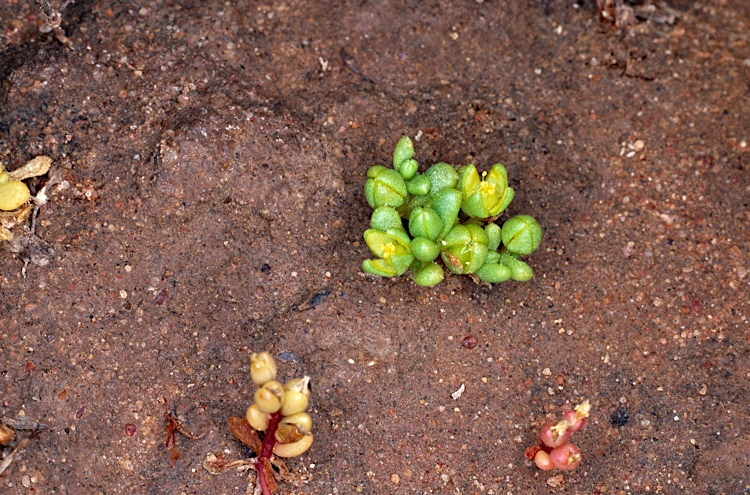
- Gunniopsis septifraga near Binnu

Scientific classification
- Kingdom: Plantae
- Clade: Tracheophytes
- Clade: Angiosperms
- Clade: Eudicots
- Order: Caryophyllales
- Family: Aizoaceae
- Genus: Gunniopsis
- Species: G. septifraga

Binomial name
- Gunniopsis septifraga (F.Muell.) Chinnock

Synonyms
- Gunnia drummondii Benth.; Gunnia septifraga F.Muell.; Neogunnia drummondii (Benth.) Pax & K.Hoffm.; Neogunnia septifraga (F.Muell.) Pax & K.Hoffm.

= Gunniopsis septifraga =

Green pigface

Species of plant

Gunniopsis septifraga, commonly known as green pigface, is a species of flowering plant in the iceplant family, Aizoaceae and is endemic to Australia. It is a prostrate to tuft-forming annual herb, with oblong to lance-shaped leaves and small greenish flowers, that grows around salt lakes.

== Description ==
Gunniopsis septifrage is a prostrate to tuft-forming, ephemeral, annual herb that typically grows to 5 cm (2.0 in) high and 15 cm (5.9 in) wide. It has thick, yellow, glabrous to sparsely hairy stems and oblong to lance-shaped leaves with the narrower end towards the base, 5–15 mm (0.20–0.59 in) long and 1–5 mm (0.039–0.197 in) wide. The flowers are arranged singly and sessile, or on a short pedicel, with the perianth 2.5–6 mm (0.098–0.236 in) long and fused for about one-third of its length with four triangular lobes. The inside of the perianth is green and the outside greenish yellow, the lobes usually alternating with four stamens. Flowering occurs from July to October and the fruit is a capsule that is more or less spherical with a cylindrical tip, and contains wrinkled, white to transparent, comma-shaped seeds.

== Taxonomy ==
This species was first formally described as Gunnia septifraga by Ferdinand von Mueller in 1859 in Report on the Plants Collected During Mr. Babbage's Expedition into the North West Interior of South Australia in 1858, presented to the Parliament of Victoria. The type specimens were collected near "Stuart's Creek" by Joseph Herrgott.

In 1867 George Bentham described Gunnia drummondii in Flora Australiensis but both Gunnia septifraga and G. drummondii were later reclassified as Neogunnia septifraga and N. drummondii by Ferdinand Pax and Käthe Hoffmann in Adolf Engler and Karl Anton Eugen Prantl's 1934 work Die Naturlichen Pflanzenfamilien.

In 1983, Robert Chinnock changed the name Neogunnia saxifraga to Gunniopsis saxifraga in the Journal of the Adelaide Botanic Gardens, the genus Gunniopsis having been described in 1889 by Pax. Chinnock considered Neogunnia drummondii to be a synonym of N. saxifraga and that interpretation is accepted by the Australian Plant Census. The specific epithet (septifraga) means to break and refers to how the seed pod breaks open.

== Distribution ==
Green pigface grows in extremely saline situations, around the edges and in the damp bottoms of salt lakes and salt pans, often forming dense patches around Tecticornia shrubs. It occurs in the Mid West, Wheatbelt and Goldfields-Esperance regions of Western Australia and in arid inland areas of the Northern Territory, South Australia and New South Wales.
