= Ronald Campbell Gunn =

Australian politician

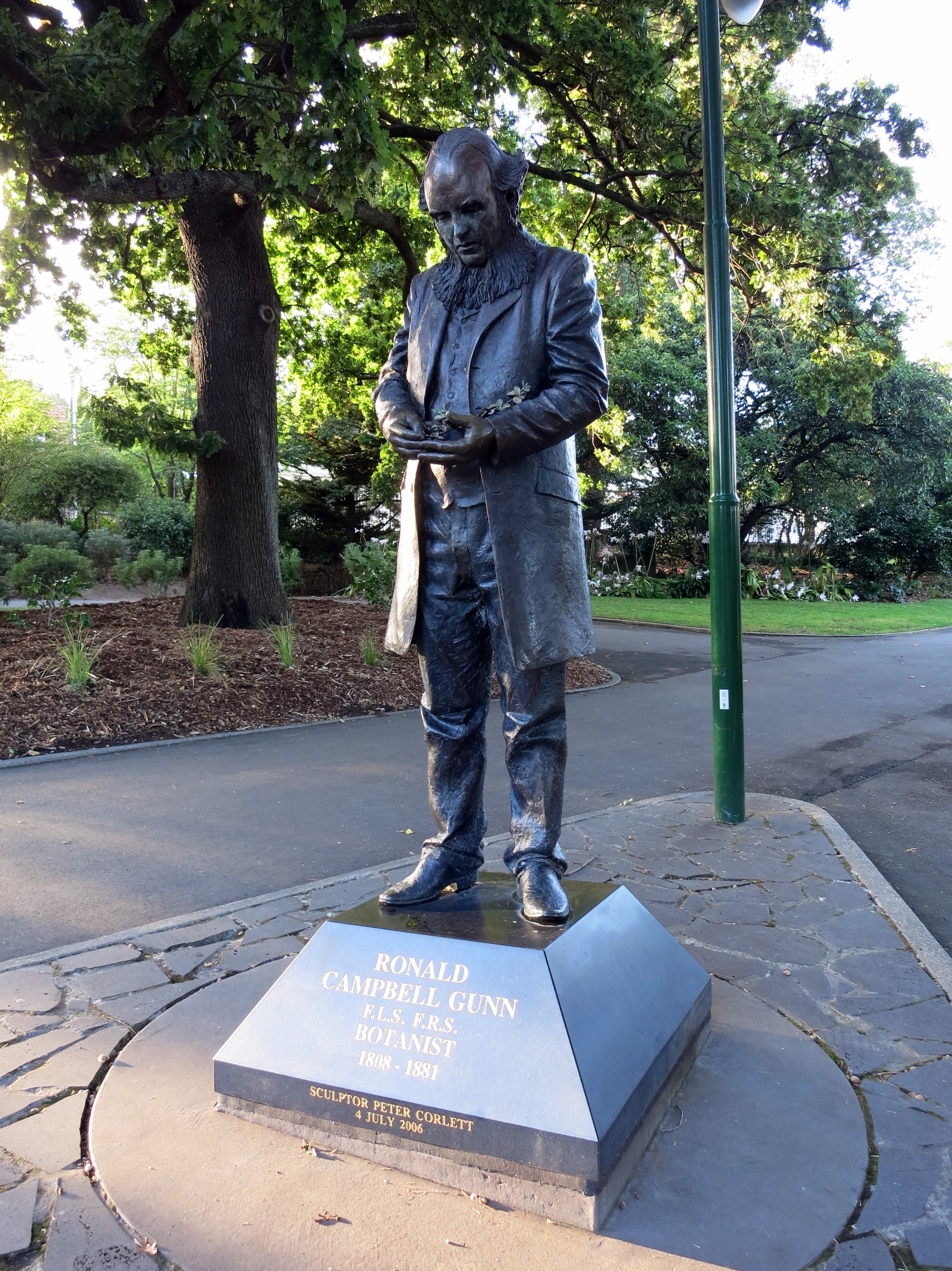
Statue of Ronald Campbell Gunn, City Park – Launceston, Tasmania

Ronald Campbell Gunn, FRS, (4 April 1808 – 13 March 1881) was a Cape Colony-born Tasmanian botanist and politician.

== Early life ==
Gunn was born at Cape Town, Cape Colony, (now South Africa), the son of William Gunn, lieutenant in the British Army's 72nd Regiment, and his wife Margaret, née Wilson.

== Career ==
Gunn is the acknowledged source of four First Nations Tasmania skulls in the Royal College of Surgeons and three in the Musee de l'Homme in Paris. The practice of stealing human remains of the original peoples of the colony was a clandestine yet wide spread trade. These remains where often put on public display and used as 'evidence' by scientists and phrenologist of the First Nation of people of Tasmania being less evolutionarily developed then their mainland Australian counterparts and the even further away from people of European origin.

In 1864 Gunn was one of the three Australian commissioners tasked by the Government of New Zealand with choosing a new capital for that country. Together with Francis Murphy (Victoria) and Joseph Docker (New South Wales), he recommended for the capital to move from Auckland to Wellington.

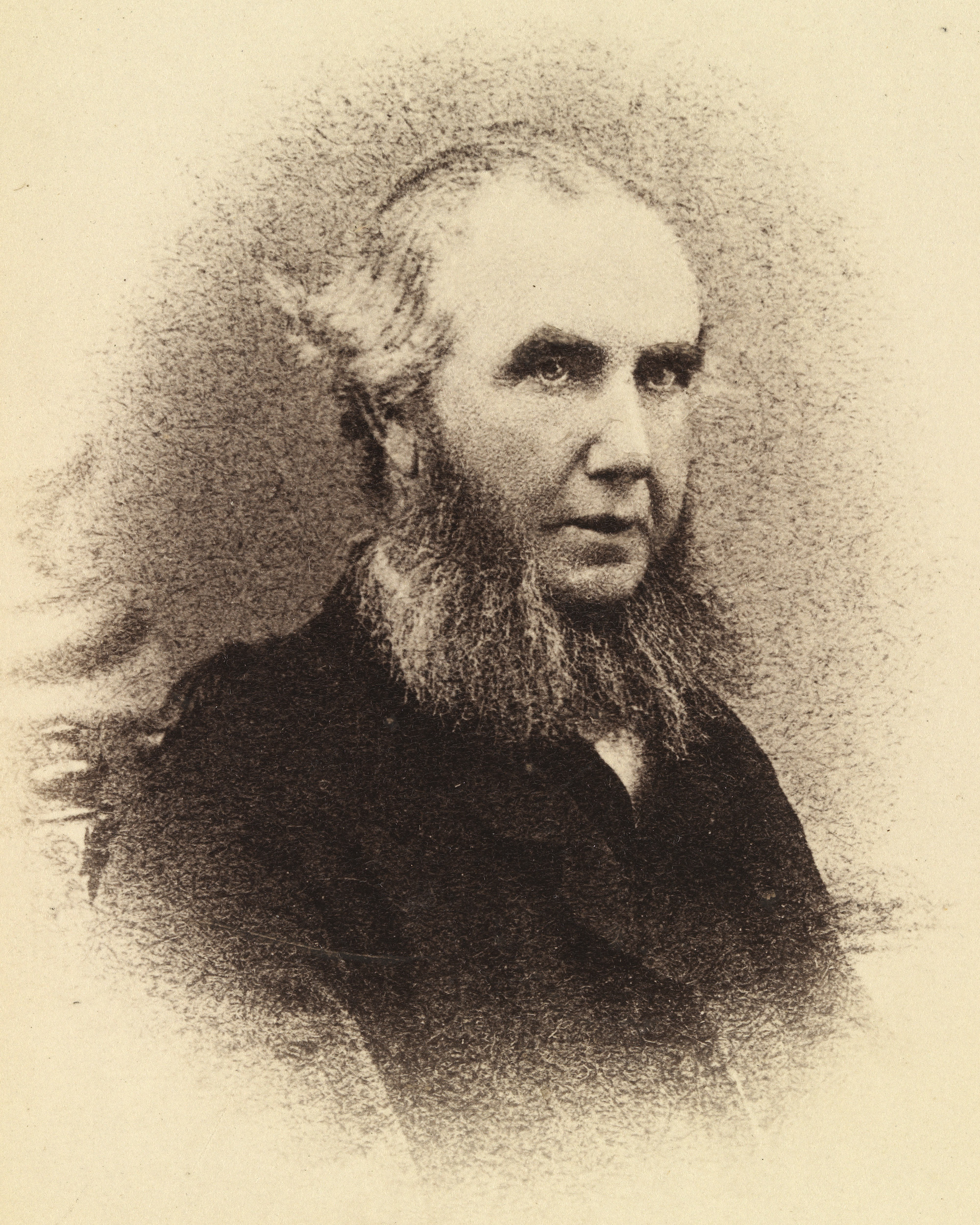
Gunn towards the end of his life – photograph by John Watt Beattie

He also served in both houses of the Tasmanian Parliament between 1855 and 1860. Gunn died on 13 March 1881 at Newstead House and was buried in the Presbyterian cemetery, Launceston. Gunn is commemorated by the genera Gunniopsis and Gunnia, and many species.

Tasmanian Legislative Council
Preceded by Richard Dry	Member for Launceston; 1855–1856; Served alongside: Adye Douglas	Abolished
