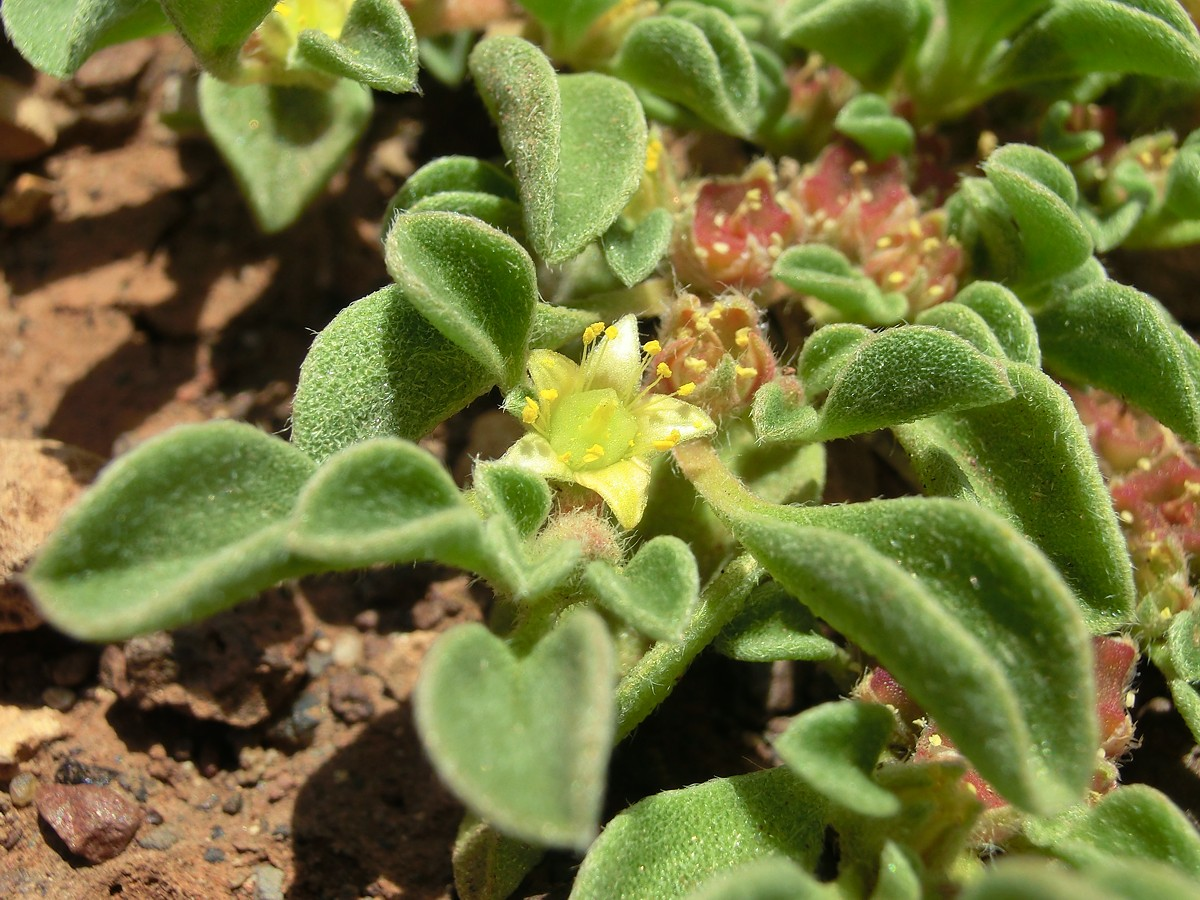
- Aizoon canariense

Scientific classification
- Kingdom: Plantae
- Clade: Tracheophytes
- Clade: Angiosperms
- Clade: Eudicots
- Order: Caryophyllales
- Family: Aizoaceae
- Subfamily: Aizooideae
- Genus: Aizoon; L.

Species
- See text

Synonyms
- Galenia L.; Kolleria C.Presl; Plinthus Fenzl; Sialodes Eckl. & Zeyh.; Tephras E.Mey. ex Sond.; Veslingia Heist. ex Fabr.

= Aizoon =

Genus of succulents

Aizoon or Aizoön is a genus of flowering plants in the iceplant family, Aizoaceae.

== Description ==
No raphides occur in at least the leaves and stalks of at least 3 species.

== Distribution ==
Apart from A. canariense, which is native to Macaronesia, North Africa, Southern Africa, Horn of Africa and West Asia, all species are native to southern Africa.

It has been introduced to California, Central Chile, Florida, New Jersey, and Spain.

== Species ==
There are currently 43 accepted species.

- Aizoon acutifolium (Adamson) Klak
- Aizoon affine (Sond.) Klak
- Aizoon africanum (L.) Klak
- Aizoon asbestinum Schltr.
- Aizoon canariense L.
- Aizoon collinum (Eckl. & Zeyh.) Klak
- Aizoon cryptocarpum (Fenzl) Klak
- Aizoon crystallinum Eckl. & Zeyh.
- Aizoon cymosum (Adamson) Klak
- Aizoon dregeanum (Fenzl ex Sond.) Klak
- Aizoon ecklonis (Walp.) Klak
- Aizoon exiguum (Adamson) Klak
- Aizoon filiforme (Thunb.) Klak
- Aizoon fruticosum L.f.
- Aizoon giessii Friedrich
- Aizoon glabrum Ewart
- Aizoon glanduliferum (Bittrich) Klak
- Aizoon glinoides L.f.
- Aizoon herniariifolium (C.Presl) Klak
- Aizoon hispidissimum (Fenzl ex Sond.) Klak
- Aizoon karooicum Compton
- Aizoon mezianum (K.Müll.) Klak
- Aizoon namaense (Schinz) Klak
- Aizoon neorigidum Klak
- Aizoon pallens (Eckl. & Zeyh.) Klak
- Aizoon paniculatum L.
- Aizoon papulosum Eckl. & Zeyh.
- Aizoon plinthoides Klak
- Aizoon portulacaceum (Fenzl ex Sond.) Klak
- Aizoon prostratum (G.Schellenb. & Schltr.) Klak
- Aizoon pruinosum (Sond.) Klak
- Aizoon pubescens Eckl. & Zeyh.
- Aizoon rehmannii (G.Schellenb.) Klak
- Aizoon rigidum L.f.
- Aizoon sarcophyllum (Fenzl ex Sond.) Klak
- Aizoon sarmentosum L.f.
- Aizoon schellenbergii Adamson
- Aizoon secundum L.f.
- Aizoon sericeum (Pax) Klak
- Aizoon subcarnosum (Adamson) Klak
- Aizoon virgatum Welw. ex Oliv.
- Aizoon zeyheri Sond.

== Bibliography ==
- Gulliver, George (1864). "Observations on Raphides and other Crystals". The Annals and Magazine of Natural History, Including Zoology, Botany, and Geology. Third Series. 14: 250–252.
