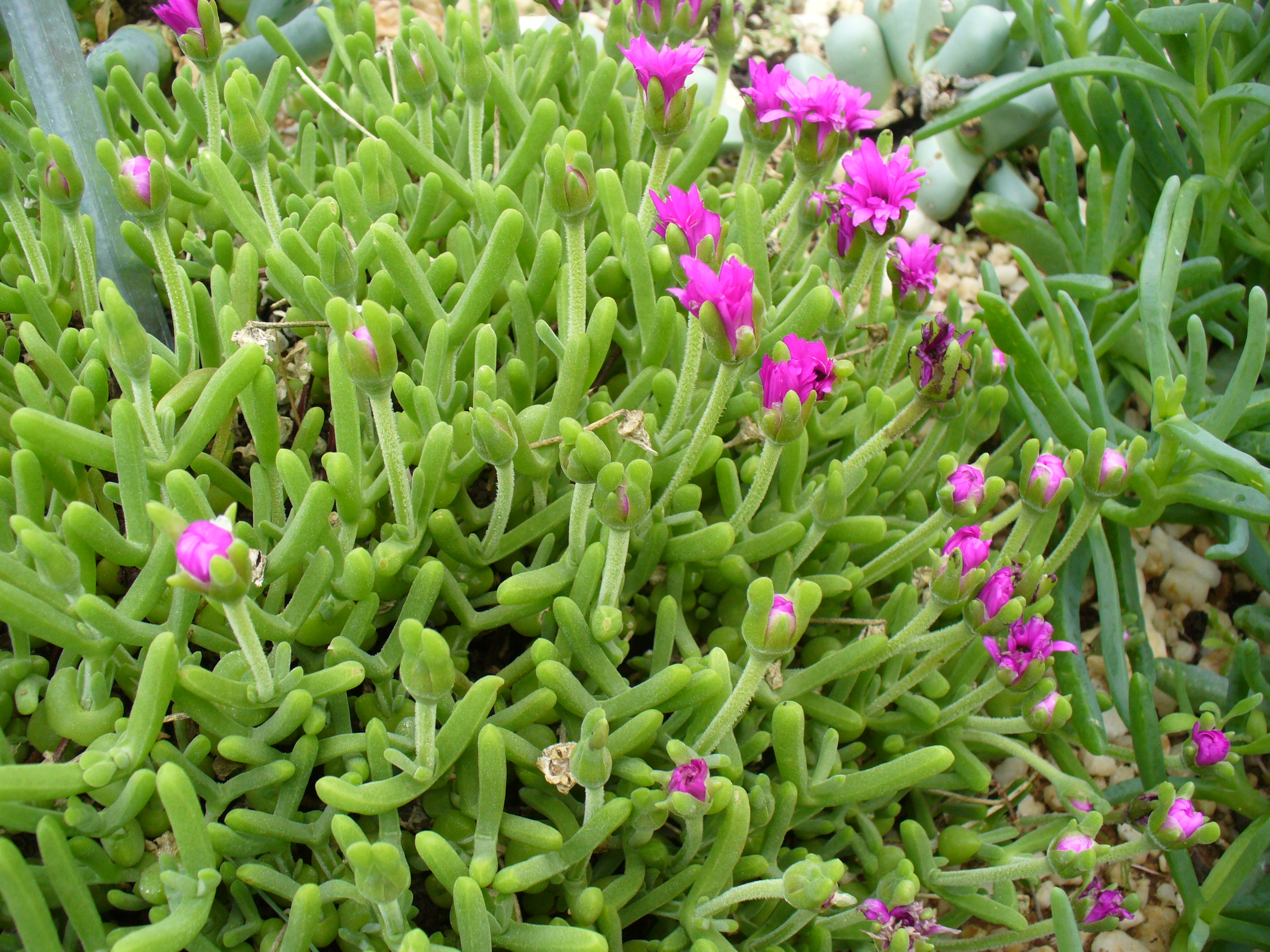
- Meyerophytum meyeri

Scientific classification
- Kingdom: Plantae
- Clade: Tracheophytes
- Clade: Angiosperms
- Clade: Eudicots
- Order: Caryophyllales
- Family: Aizoaceae
- Subfamily: Ruschioideae
- Tribe: Ruschieae
- Genus: Meyerophytum; Schwantes

Species
- See text

Synonyms
- Depacarpus N.E.Br.

= Meyerophytum =

Genus of succulents

Meyerophytum is a genus of succulent plants of the family Aizoaceae, indigenous to the arid region of the Namaqualand and Richtersveld, in the far north-west of South Africa.

The species are small succulent shrubs that grow short slender stems, at the top of which the succulent leaves appear in alternating pairs. Similar to the closely related genera of Monilaria and Mitrophyllum, these leaf-pairs alternate consecutively between two different types of leaf-growth (heterophylly) and during the exceptionally hot summer they remain inactive in a dry sheath. They produce purple or white flowers in spring and rely on winter rainfall in their dry environment. Of the two recorded species, Meyerophytum meyeri is relatively common in the Namaqualand, but Meyerophytum globosum has a more restricted natural range and is threatened by mining and cattle farming.

== Species ==
Two species are accepted.

- Meyerophytum globosum (L.Bolus) Ihlenf.
- Meyerophytum meyeri (Schwantes) Schwantes
