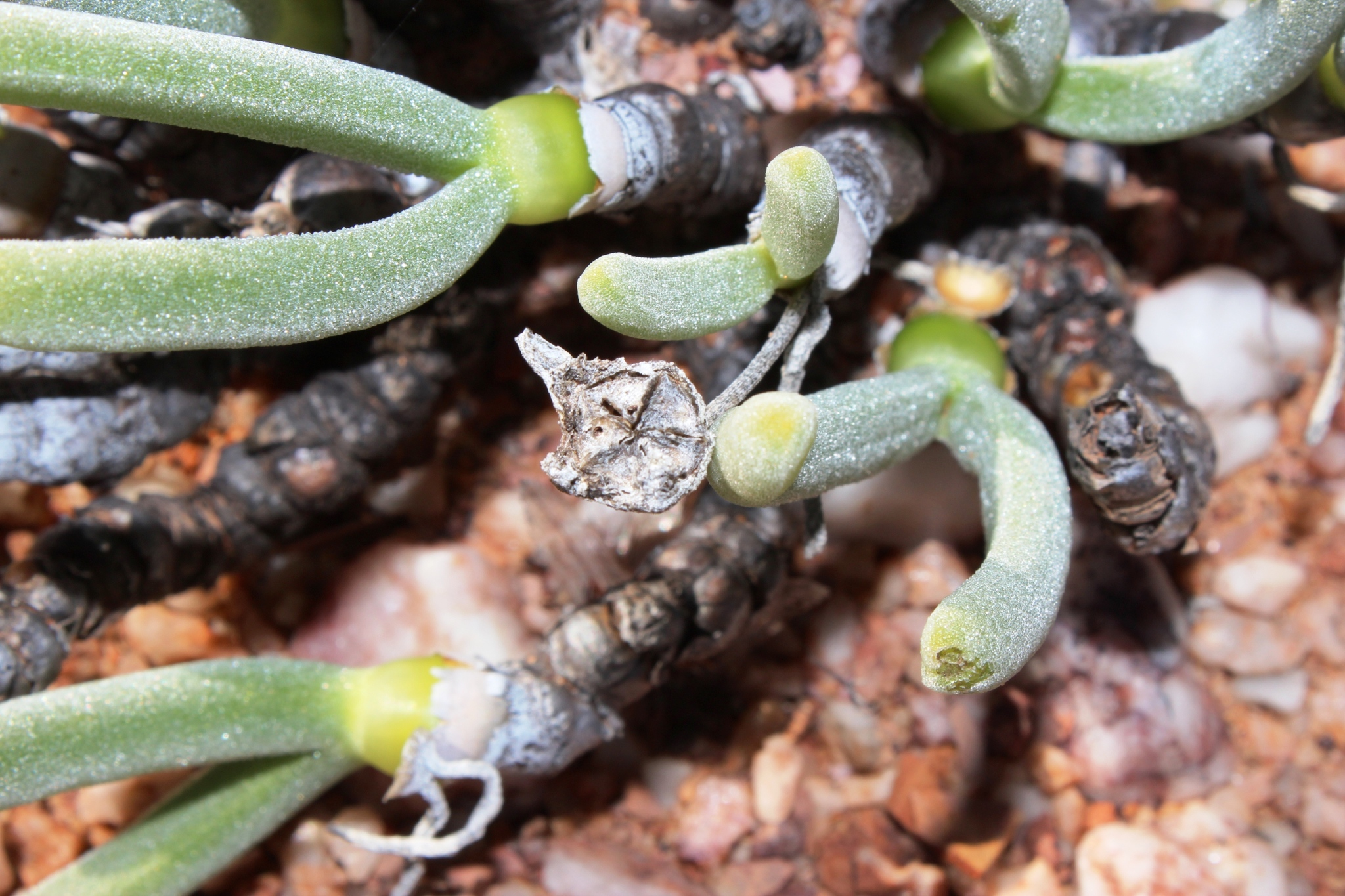

Scientific classification
- Kingdom: Plantae
- Clade: Tracheophytes
- Clade: Angiosperms
- Clade: Eudicots
- Order: Caryophyllales
- Family: Aizoaceae
- Genus: Monilaria
- Species: M. pisiformis

Binomial name
- Monilaria pisiformis (Haw.) Schwantes

Synonyms
- Conophyllum pisiforme (Haw.) Schwantes; Mesembryanthemum pisiforme Haw.; Mitrophyllum pisiforme (Haw.) Schwantes; Schwantesia pisiformis (Haw.) L.Bolus

= Monilaria pisiformis =

Species of plant

Monilaria pisiformis is a succulent plant in the Aizoaceae family. The species is endemic to South Africa and occurs in the Western Cape from Vredendal to the Olifants River. The plant has a range of 30 km² and two subpopulations are known. The species is losing some of its habitat to the establishment of vineyards and tomato cultivation.
