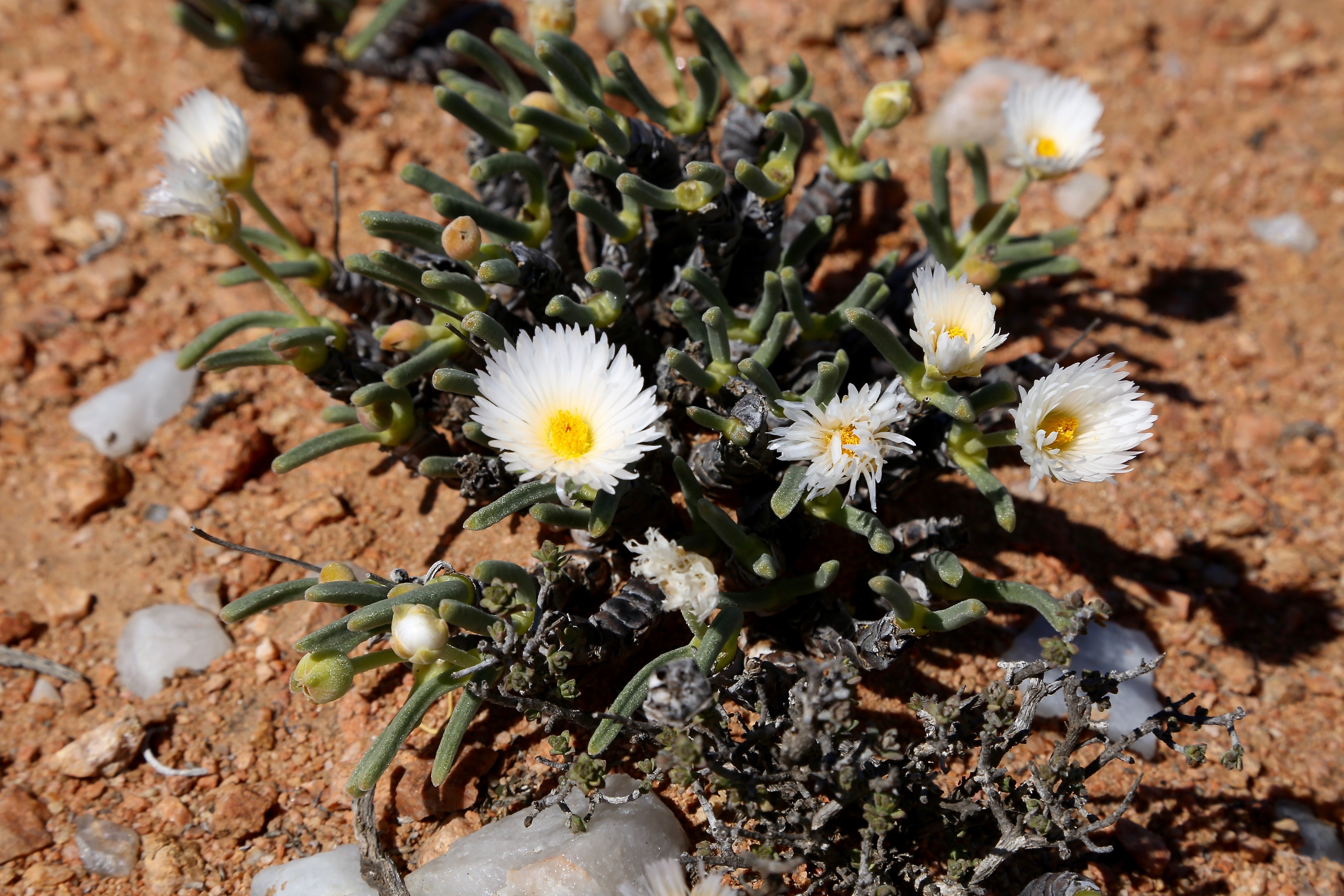

Scientific classification
- Kingdom: Plantae
- Clade: Tracheophytes
- Clade: Angiosperms
- Clade: Eudicots
- Order: Caryophyllales
- Family: Aizoaceae
- Genus: Monilaria
- Species: M. scutata

Binomial name
- Monilaria scutata (L.Bolus) Schwantes

Synonyms
- Conophyllum scutatum (L.Bolus) Schwantes; Mesembryanthemum scutatum L.Bolus; Mitrophyllum scutatum (L.Bolus) Schwantes; Schwantesia scutata (L.Bolus) L.Bolus

= Monilaria scutata =

Species of plant

Monilaria scutata is a succulent plant that is part of the Aizoaceae family. The species is endemic to South Africa and occurs in the Northern Cape.

The species has two subspecies:

- Monilaria scutata subsp. obovata Ihlenf. & S.Jörg.
- Monilaria scutata subsp. scutata
