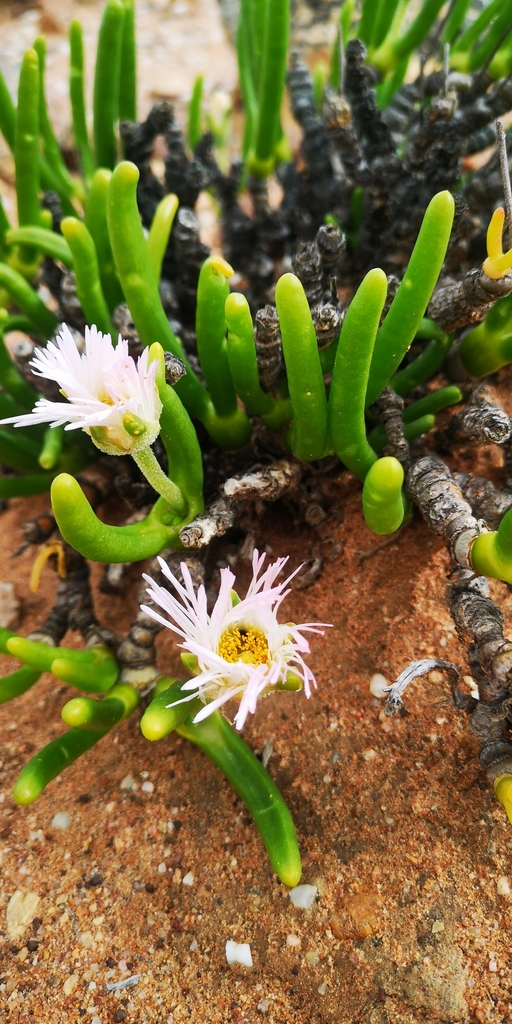

Scientific classification
- Kingdom: Plantae
- Clade: Tracheophytes
- Clade: Angiosperms
- Clade: Eudicots
- Order: Caryophyllales
- Family: Aizoaceae
- Genus: Monilaria
- Species: M. chrysoleuca

Binomial name
- Monilaria chrysoleuca (Schltr.) Schwantes

Synonyms
- Conophyllum chrysoleucum (Schltr.) Schwantes; Mesembryanthemum chrysoleucum Schltr.; Mitrophyllum chrysoleucum (Schltr.) Schwantes; Monilaria chrysoleuca var. polita (L.Bolus) Ihlenf. & S.Jörg.; Monilaria chrysoleuca var. purpurea L.Bolus; Monilaria chrysoleuca f. purpurea (L.Bolus) G.D.Rowley; Monilaria polita L.Bolus; Monilaria salmonea L.Bolus; Schwantesia chrysoleuca (Schltr.) L.Bolus

= Monilaria chrysoleuca =

Species of plant

Monilaria chrysoleuca is a succulent plant in the Aizoaceae family. The species is endemic to South Africa and occurs in the Western Cape. It is a sparsely branching shrub of up to 20 cm (7.9 in) tall with stems of up to 1½ cm in diameter. The stems are succulent and have regular circular constrictions. The internodes and the bud that will produce next years growth is completely covered by tough and hardened sheaths. The first and second leaf-pairs differ in shape. The first leaf-pair forms a globe of up to 1 cm (0.39 in) in diameter. The leaves of the second pair are approximately 10 cm (3.9 in) long and 3–5 mm (0.12–0.20 in) in diameter. The flowers that appear in July and August sit individually on up to 10 cm long flower stalks. The petals appear in a range of colours from magenta, red, salmon, orange, yellow or white. Petal-like coloured staminodes are present. The dry fruit has five, sometimes six compartments each covered by a valve. This species grows in fats in quartzite peppelfields near Vanrhynsdorp.
