= Monilaria obconica =

Scientific classification
- Kingdom: Plantae
- Clade: Tracheophytes
- Clade: Angiosperms
- Clade: Eudicots
- Order: Caryophyllales
- Family: Aizoaceae
- Genus: Monilaria
- Species: M. obconica

Binomial name
- Monilaria obconica Ihlenf. & S.Jörg.

Species of plant

Monilaria obconica, the bunny succulent, is a species from family Aizoaceae. This species is endemic to the Namaqualand region.

The resemblance of Monilaria obconica's leaves to bunny ears and its other features facilitated a surge in popularity on Twitter throughout Japan in 2017. It is similar to Monilaria moniliformis, the bunny ear succulent.
