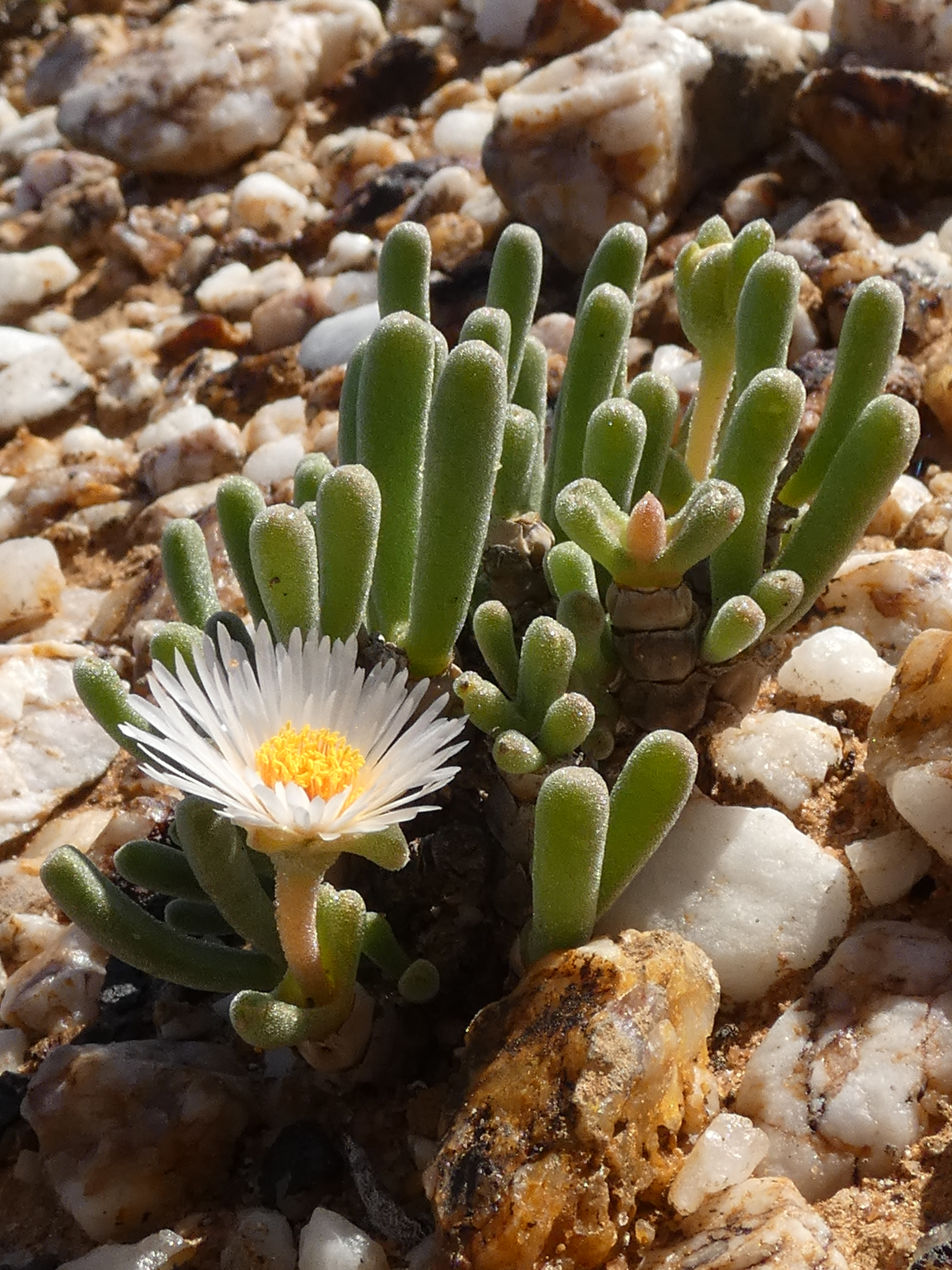
- In the wild, amongst quartz pebbles
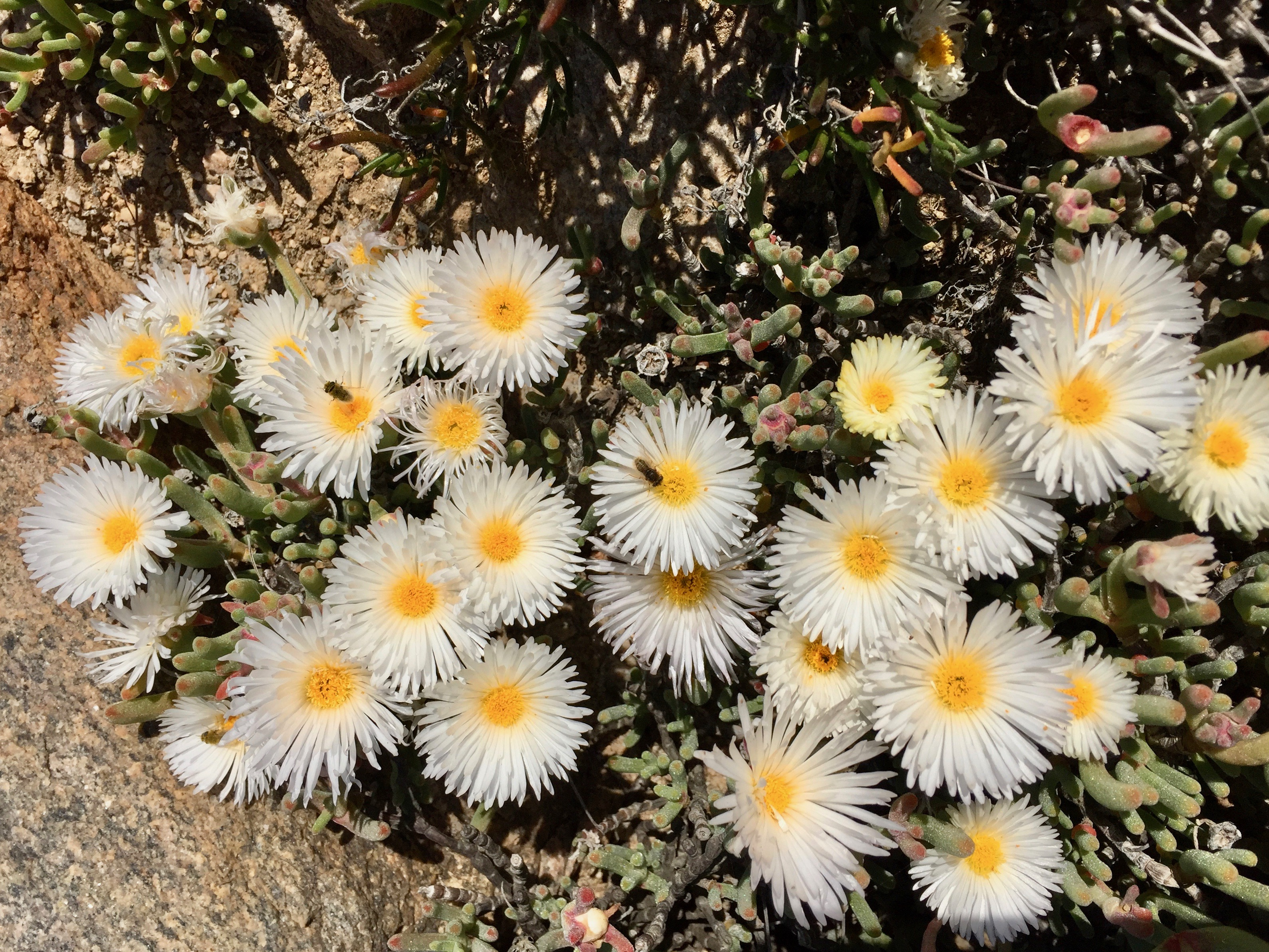
- Flowers with insects

Scientific classification
- Kingdom: Plantae
- Clade: Tracheophytes
- Clade: Angiosperms
- Clade: Eudicots
- Order: Caryophyllales
- Family: Aizoaceae
- Genus: Monilaria
- Species: M. moniliformis

Binomial name
- Monilaria moniliformis (Thunb.) Schwantes

Synonyms
- Conophyllum moniliforme (Thunb.) Schwantes; Mesembryanthemum moniliforme Thunb.; Mitrophyllum moniliforme (Thunb.) Schwantes; Monilaria peersii L.Bolus; Schwantesia moniliformis (Thunb.) L.Bolus

= Monilaria moniliformis =

Species of plant

Monilaria moniliformis, the bunny ear succulent, is a species of flowering plant in the family Aizoaceae. It is native to the southwestern Cape Provinces of South Africa. It is similar to Monilaria obconica, the bunny succulent. A succulent with soft, fuzzy leaves, it is typically found in quartz-fields of the Succulent Karoo.
