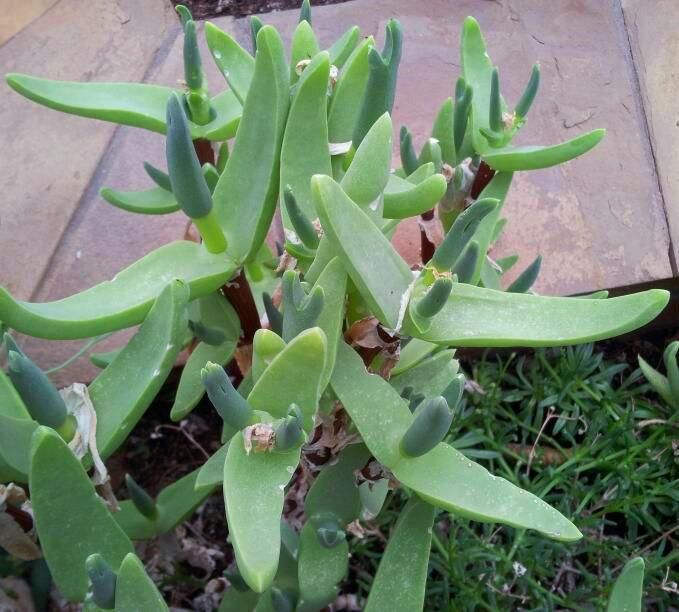
- Mitrophyllum mitratum

Scientific classification
- Kingdom: Plantae
- Clade: Tracheophytes
- Clade: Angiosperms
- Clade: Eudicots
- Order: Caryophyllales
- Family: Aizoaceae
- Subfamily: Ruschioideae
- Tribe: Ruschieae
- Genus: Mitrophyllum; Schwantes

Species
- See text

Synonyms
- Conophyllum Schwantes; Mimetophytum L.Bolus

= Mitrophyllum =

Genus of succulents

Mitrophyllum is a genus of succulent plants of the family Aizoaceae, indigenous to the arid Richtersveld region, in the Northern Cape province of northwestern South Africa near the border with Namibia.

== Description ==
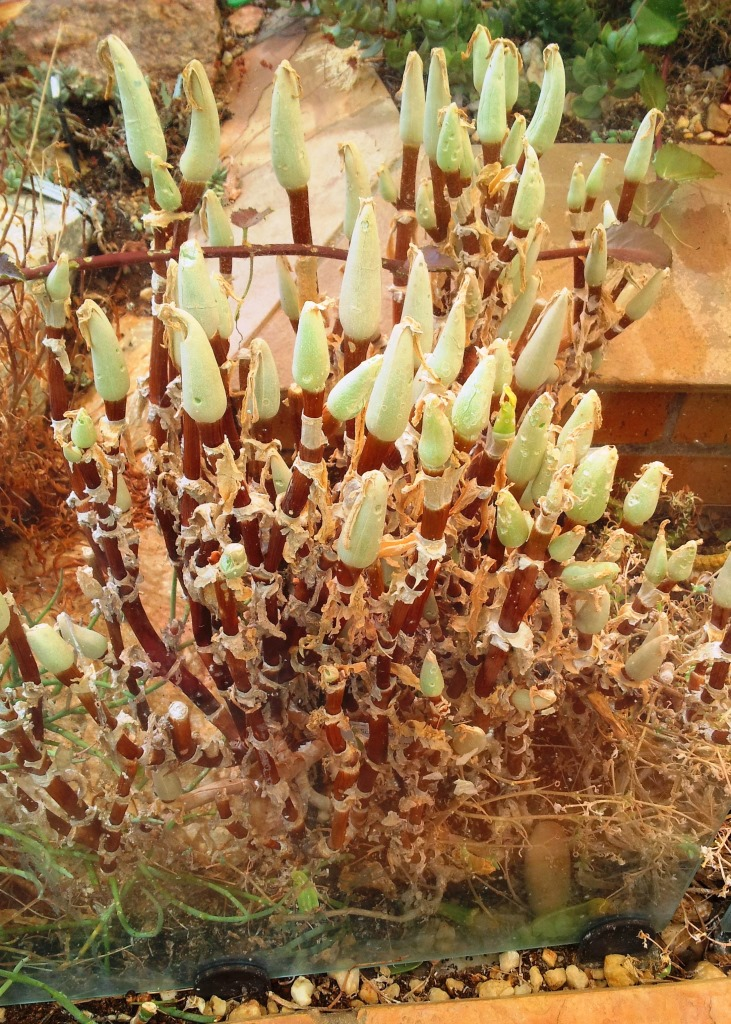
Mitrophyllum mitratum showing the papery sheath in which the new pairs of leaves are held before rains.

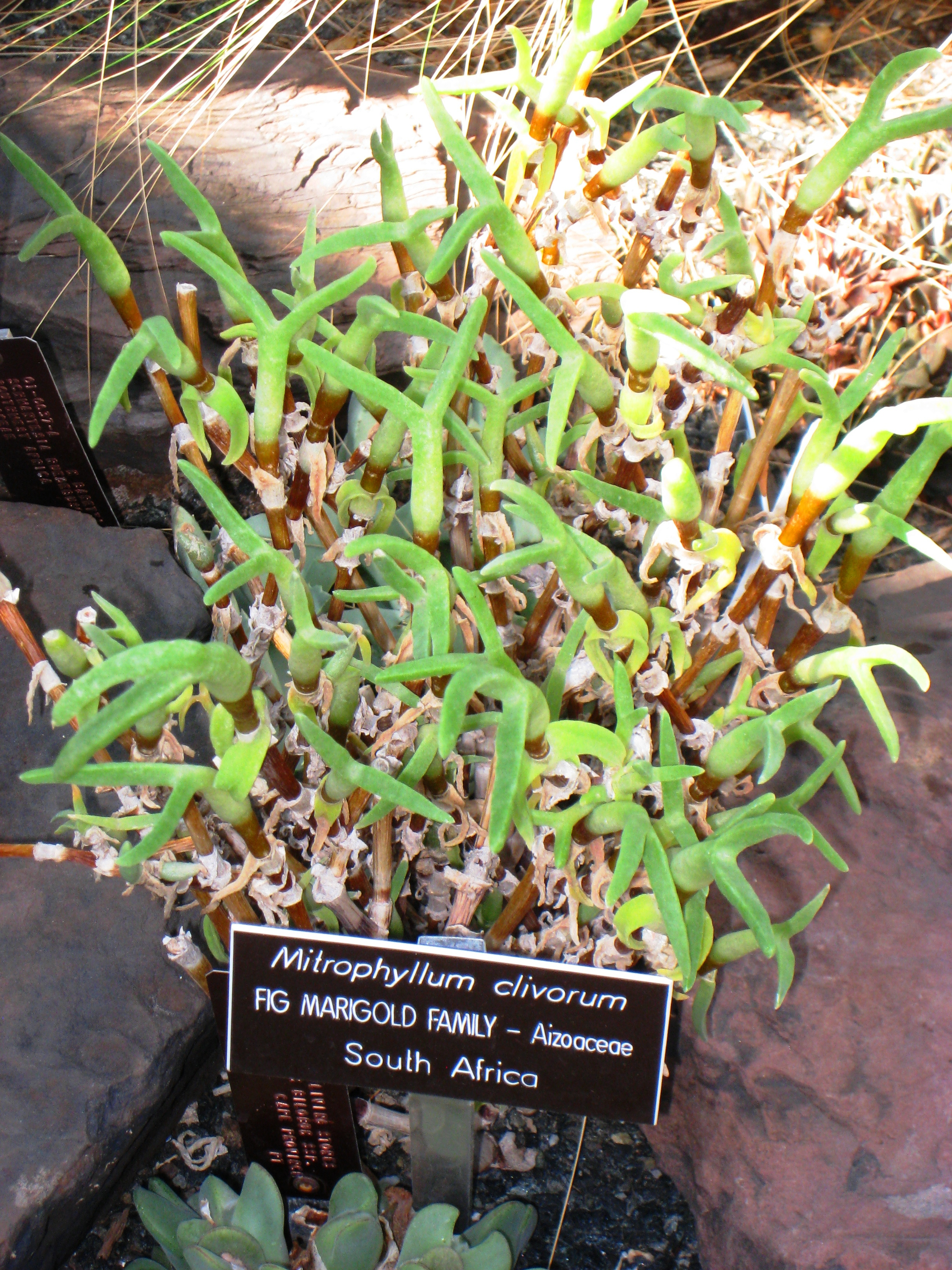
Mitrophyllum clivorum.

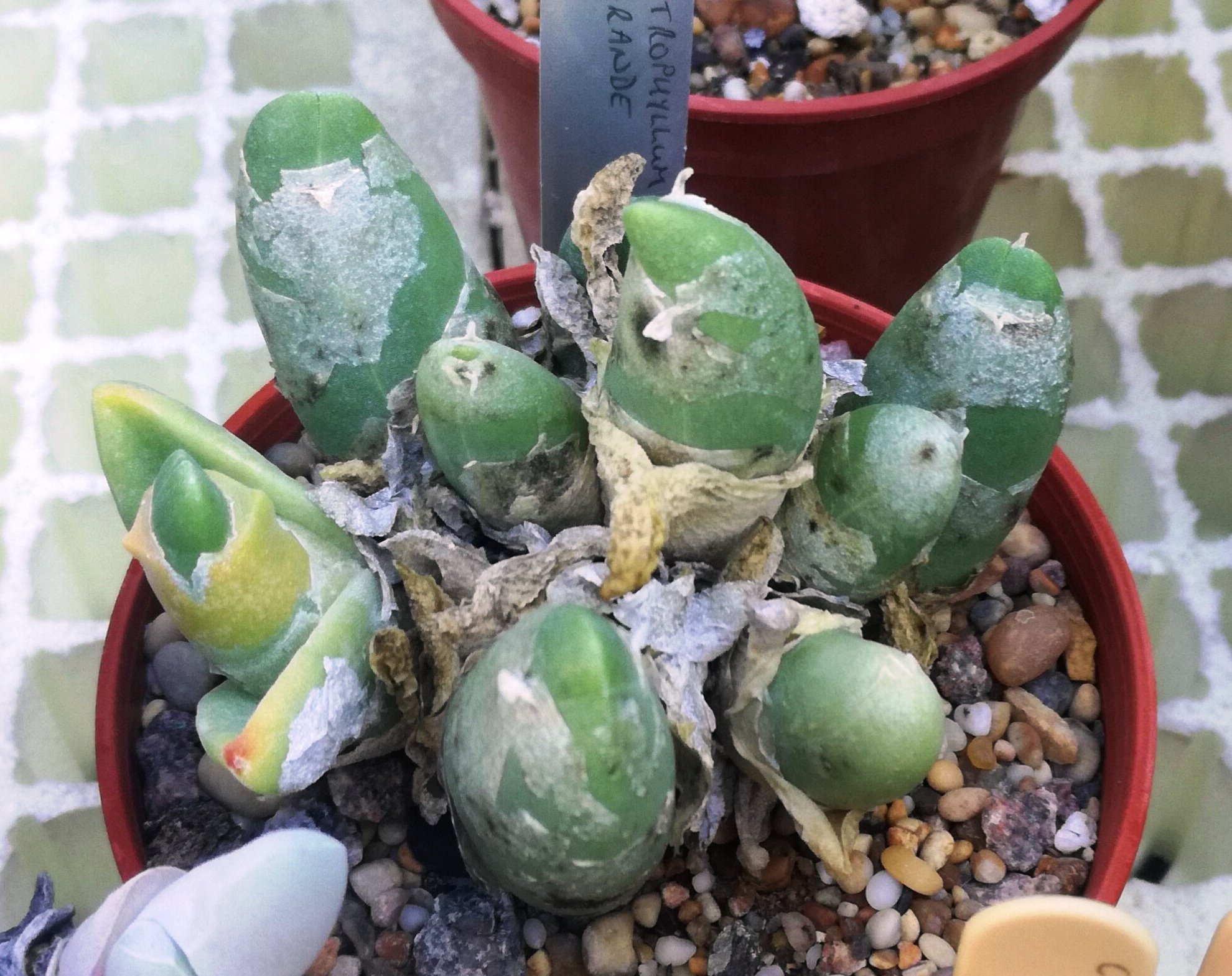
Mitrophyllum grande.

The species generally grow stems, at the top of which two succulent leaves appear. Similar to the closely related genera of Monilaria and Meyerophytum, these leaf-pairs alternate consecutively between two different types of leaf-growth (heterophylly) and during the exceptionally hot summer they remain inactive in a dry sheath. When fused together into a cone-shaped corpuscle, this leaf pair is referred to as the plant's "mitre", and this is the origin of the genus name. The two separate leaves of the free leaf-pair are rounded-triangular to tongue-shaped. The fused leaf-pair forms a cone-shaped to cylindrical corpuscle, which bears two smaller ear-like anthers at the top. This fused corpuscle dries out in the plant's dormancy period, eventually becoming a papery sheath in which the new (separate) leaf-pair forms.

== Cultivation ==
In cultivation, the plants are not difficult to grow. However they require deep well-drained sandy soil and sufficient sun exposure. They are also adapted to very dry summers and watering mainly over the winter. Their period of growth is primarily over late autumn and winter.

They are slow growing, maturing over many decades, and are difficult to propagate by cuttings; consequently seed is the preferred means of propagation.

== Species ==
Seven species are accepted.

- Mitrophyllum abbreviatum L.Bolus, a slender, low and densely branched shrub, up to 40 cm tall. Free leaves 10–30 × 5–8 mm. Fused leaf-pair forming oval-rounded corpuscle that is wider than stem. Occurs in quartz rock crevices in the Augrabies area.
- Mitrophyllum clivorum (N.E.Br.) Schwantes, a slender-stemmed shrub, up to 60 cm tall. Free leaves 10–50 × 8–20 mm. Fused leaf-pair forming corpuscle that is roughly as wide as the stem (1–4 cm long and c.1 cm wide). Yellow-white flowers appear in May–June. Grows in sheltered places near the Namibian-South African border.
- Mitrophyllum dissitum (N.E.Br.) Schwantes, a slender, multi-branched shrub, 40–60 cm tall. Free leaves 10–50 × 8–15 mm. Fused leaf pair forms connate corpuscle 10–40 mm long and 5–15 mm wide. Yellow-white and pinkish flowers. The fruit stalk of this species is uniquely dark brown and corky at its base. Occurs on steep, rocky, south-facing slopes.
- Mitrophyllum grande N.E.Br., a low, compact, un-branched perennial, up to 20 cm tall, with short-shoots only from which erect long-shoots develop. The internodes between the leaf-pairs are over a centimeter in diameter. Free leaf-pairs are 6–12 cm x 2–3 cm, and the very large, oval "mitres" (paired leaves) are 2–10 cm x 1.5-3.5 cm. Yellow-white (occasionally pinkish) flowers appear in May to July. The fruits are partially covered in membranes, and born on straight, erect stalks. This species occurs on south-facing slopes among quartz stones near the Namibian border.
- Mitrophyllum margaretae S.A.Hammer, Northern Cape
- Mitrophyllum mitratum (Marloth) Schwantes, a slowly-branching, compact, caudiciform shrub, up to 60 cm in height. Free leaves are 4–10 cm x c.2 cm. Fused leaf-pair forms large cylindrical cone, 3.5–10 cm x 1.5-3.5 cm. Yellow-white (occasionally pinkish) flowers break out of the fused leaf-cone from February to March. The fruita only sometimes have a very narrow membrane covering them, and are born on straight, erect stalks. It occurs on south-facing slopes, among quartz rocks in the northern Namaqualand near the Namibian border.
- Mitrophyllum roseum L.Bolus, a low succulent shrub up to 15 cm tall and often drooping. Distinguished by its magenta flowers, and its exposed fruits that are born on bent stalks. It grows on foggy, west-facing slopes near Komaggas.
