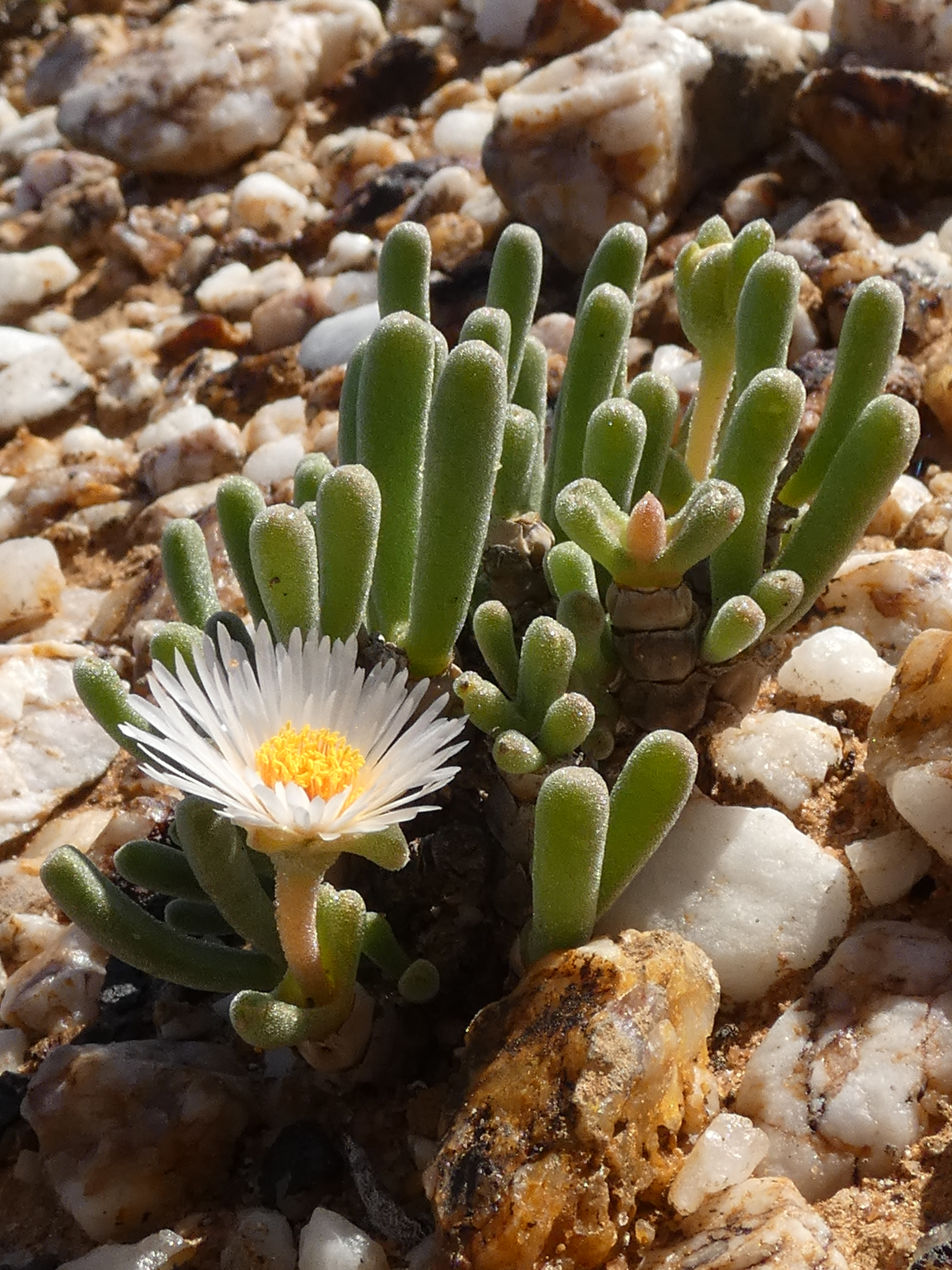
- Monilaria moniliformis

Scientific classification
- Kingdom: Plantae
- Clade: Tracheophytes
- Clade: Angiosperms
- Clade: Eudicots
- Order: Caryophyllales
- Family: Aizoaceae
- Subfamily: Ruschioideae
- Tribe: Ruschieae
- Genus: Monilaria (Schwantes) Schwantes

Type species
- Monilaria chrysoleuca (Schltr.) Schwantes

Synonyms
- Mitrophyllum subgen. Monilaria Schwantes; Schwantesia L.Bolus

= Monilaria =

Genus of plants

Monilaria is a genus of plants in the family Aizoaceae. It is endemic to the Cape Provinces of South Africa.

== Species ==
Five species are accepted.

- Monilaria chrysoleuca (Schltr.) Schwantes
- Monilaria moniliformis (Thunb.) Schwantes
- Monilaria obconica Ihlenf. & S.Jörg.
- Monilaria pisiformis (Haw.) Schwantes
- Monilaria scutata (L.Bolus) Schwantes
