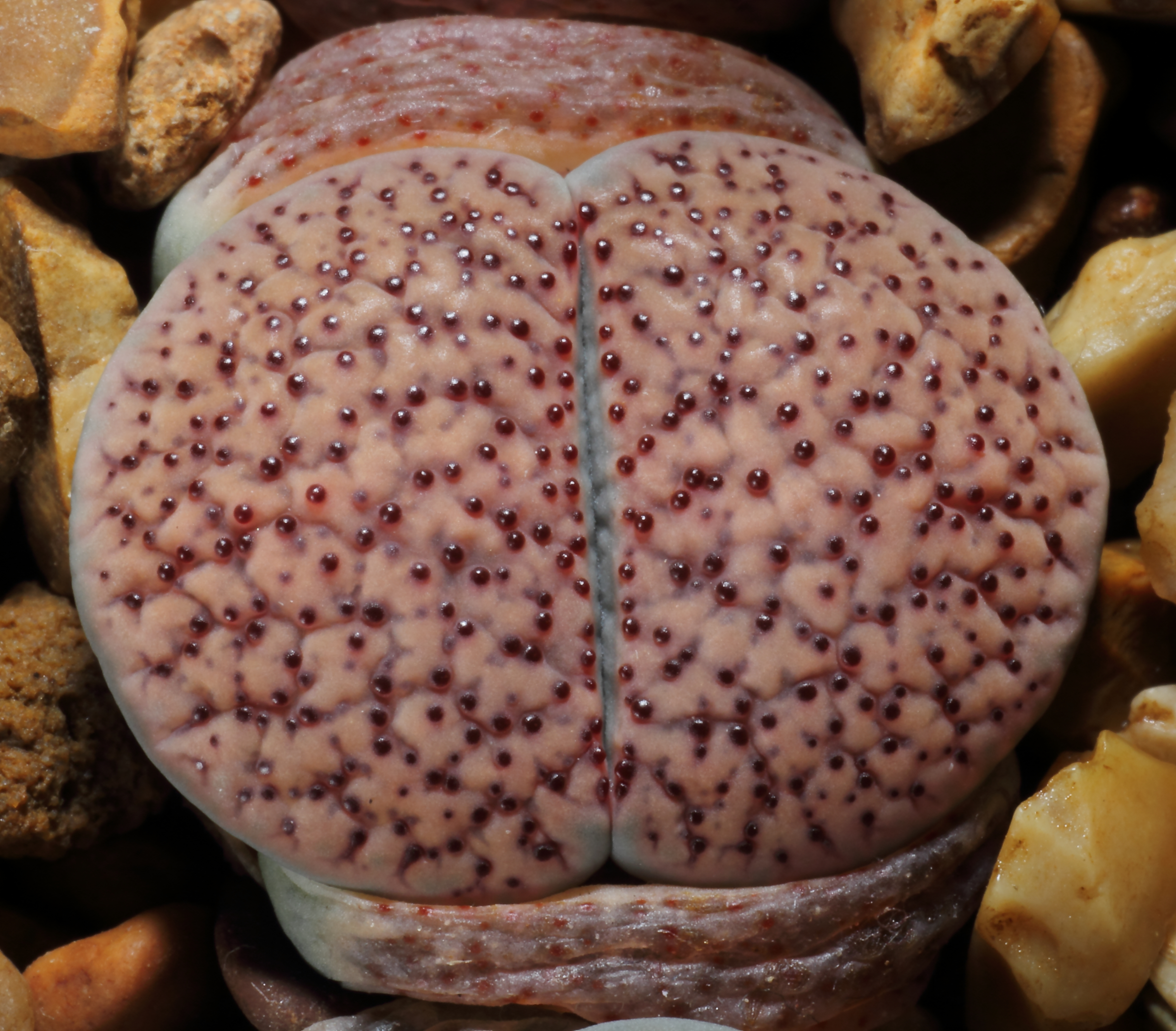

Scientific classification
- Kingdom: Plantae
- Clade: Tracheophytes
- Clade: Angiosperms
- Clade: Eudicots
- Order: Caryophyllales
- Family: Aizoaceae
- Genus: Lithops
- Species: L. verruculosa

Binomial name
- Lithops verruculosa Nel

= Lithops verruculosa =

Species of succulent

Lithops verruculosa is a species of plant in the family Aizoaceae. It is endemic to the Northern Cape Province of South Africa.
