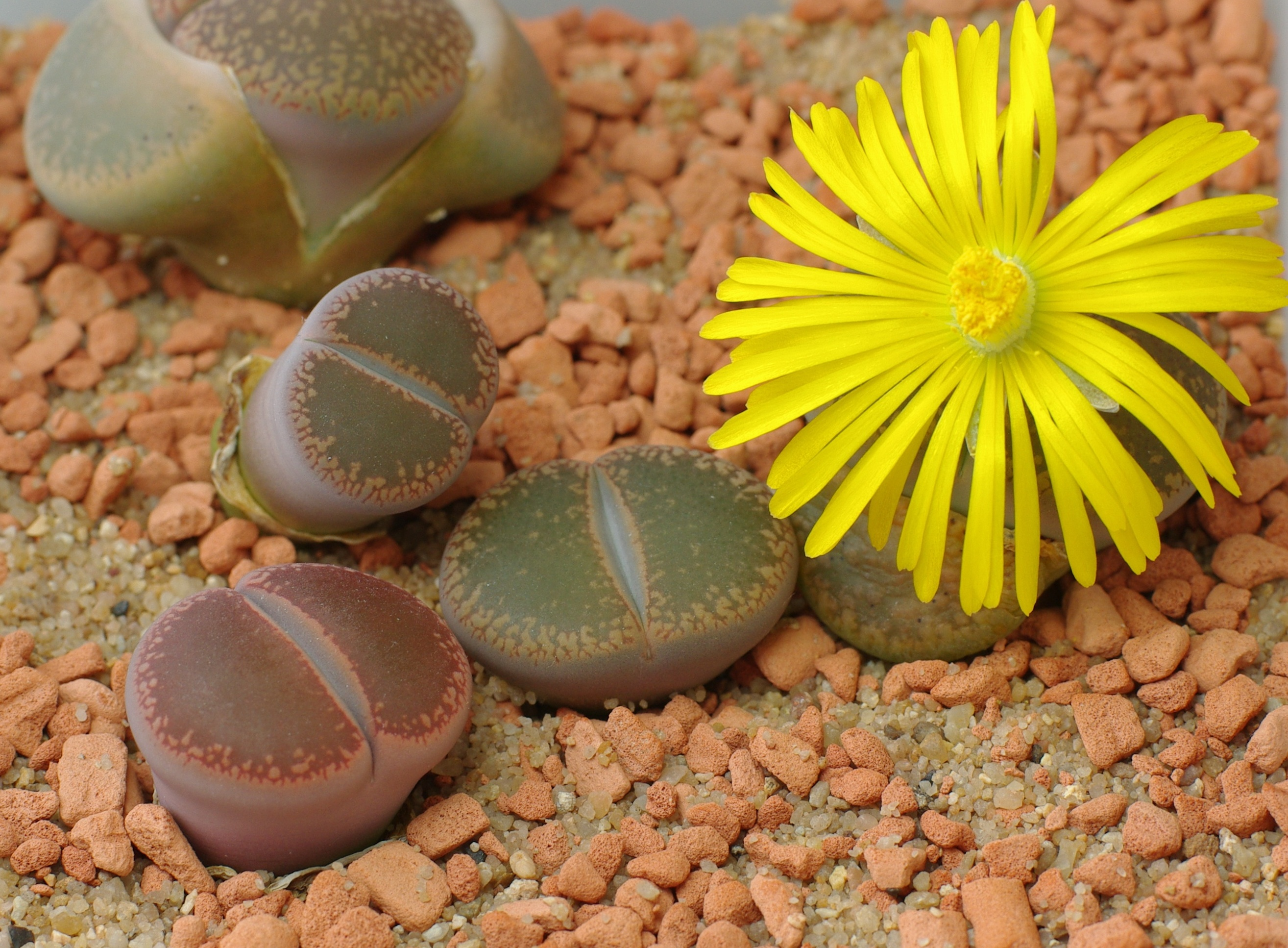

Scientific classification
- Kingdom: Plantae
- Clade: Tracheophytes
- Clade: Angiosperms
- Clade: Eudicots
- Order: Caryophyllales
- Family: Aizoaceae
- Subfamily: Ruschioideae
- Tribe: Ruschieae
- Genus: Lithops; N.E.Br.

Species
- See text

= Lithops =

Genus of plants

Lithops is a genus of succulent plants in the ice plant family, Aizoaceae. Members of the genus are native to southern Africa. They avoid being eaten by herbivores with their camouflage as small stones, and are often known as pebble plants or living stones.

"Lithops" is both the genus name and the common name, and is singular as well as plural. The name is derived from the Ancient Greek words λίθος (líthos) 'stone' and ὄψ (óps) 'face', referring to the stone-like appearance of the plants.

== Description ==
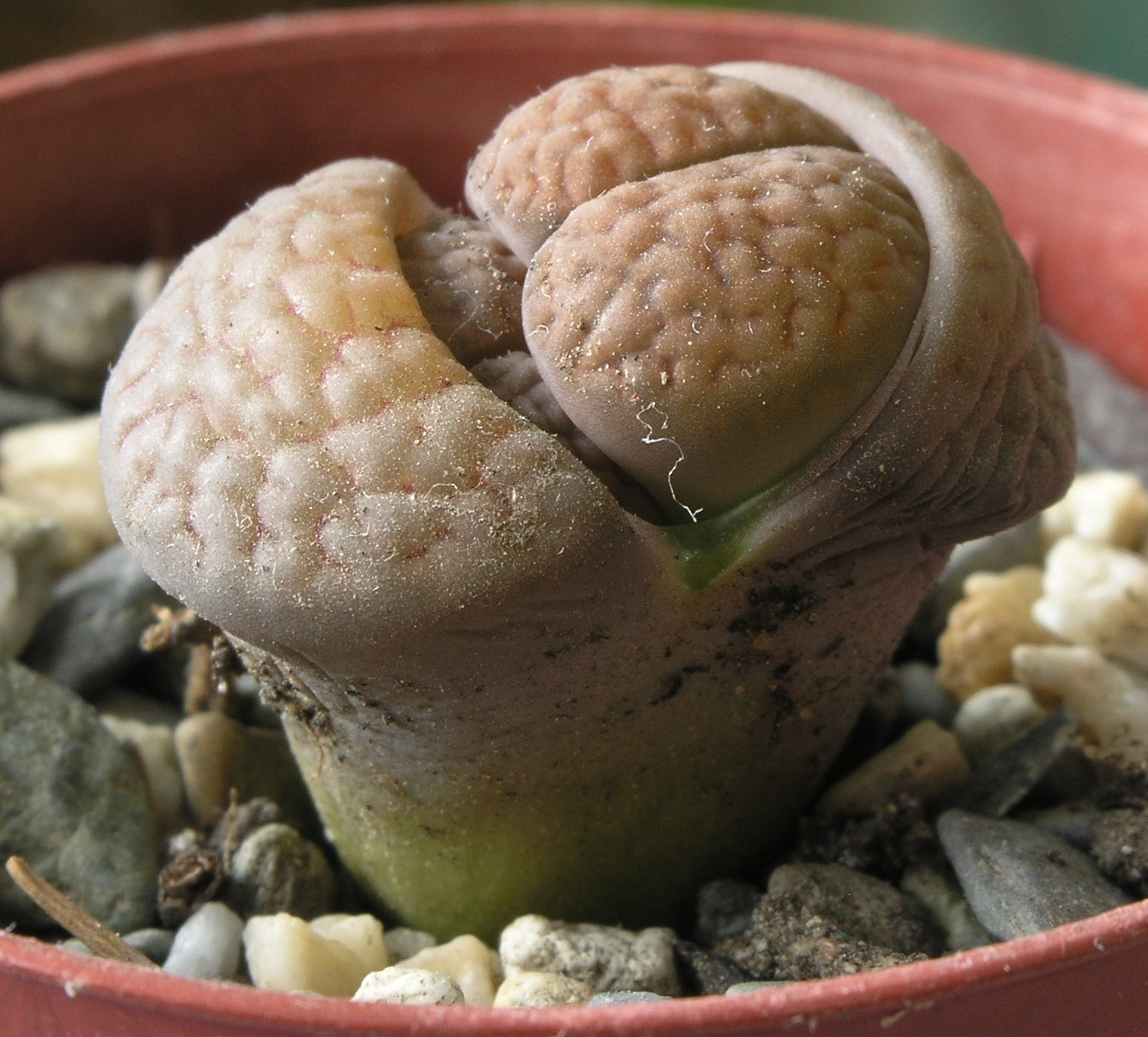
Lithops hookeri. Two new leaf pairs are emerging between the old one, leading to a double-headed plant

Individual Lithops consist of one or more pairs of bulbous, almost fused leaves opposite each other and hardly any stem. The slit between the leaves contains the meristem and produces flowers and new leaves. The leaves of Lithops are mostly buried below the surface of the soil, with a partially or completely translucent top surface known as a leaf window which allows light to enter the interior of the leaves for photosynthesis.

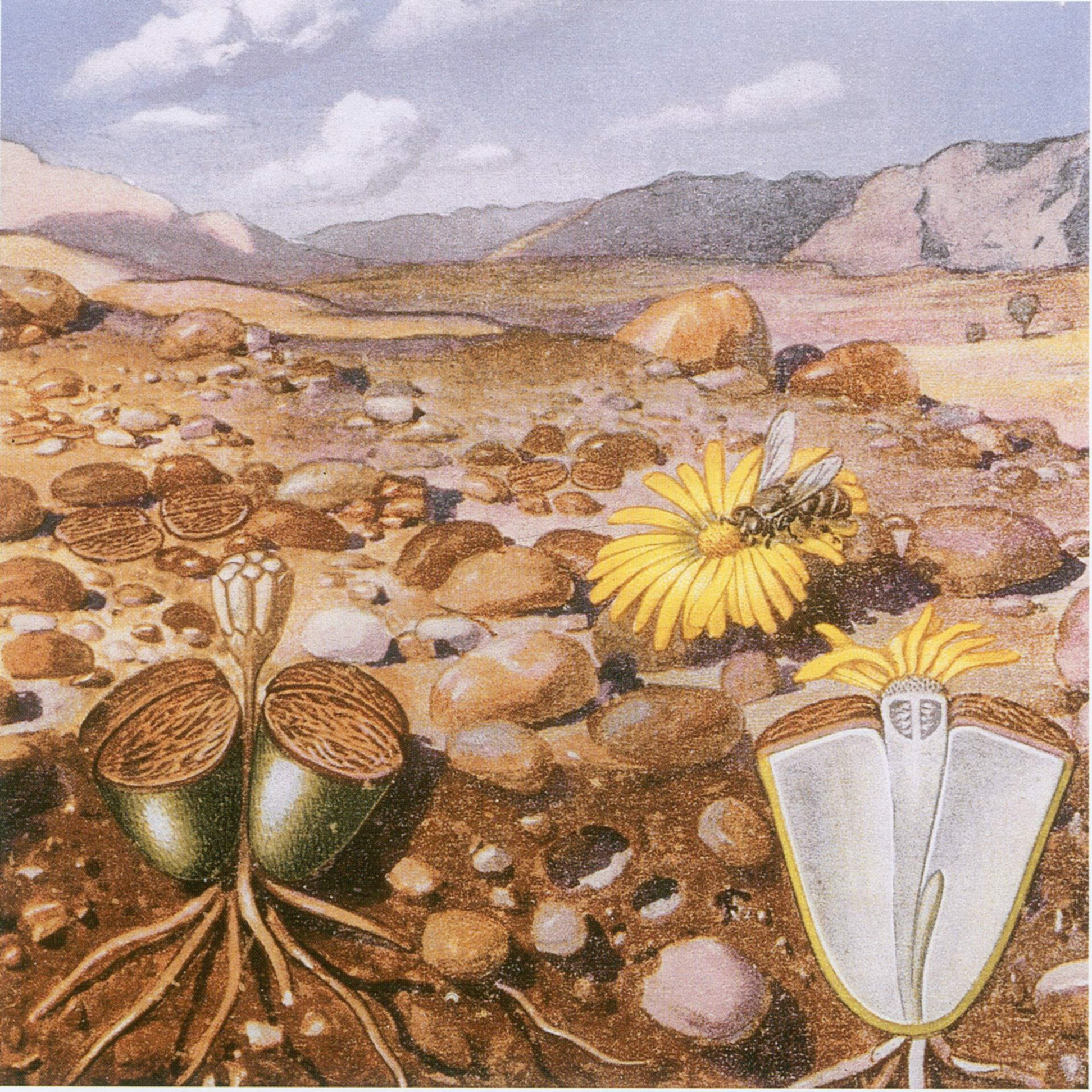
Illustration by Rudolf Marloth, 1929

During winter a new leaf pair, or occasionally more than one, grows inside the existing fused leaf pair. In spring the old leaf pair parts to reveal the new leaves and the old leaves will then dry up. Lithops leaves may shrink and disappear below ground level during drought. Yellow or white flowers emerge from the fissure between the leaves after the new leaf pair fully matures, one per leaf pair. This is usually in autumn, but can be before the summer solstice in L. pseudotruncatella and after the winter solstice in L. optica. The flowers are often sweetly scented.

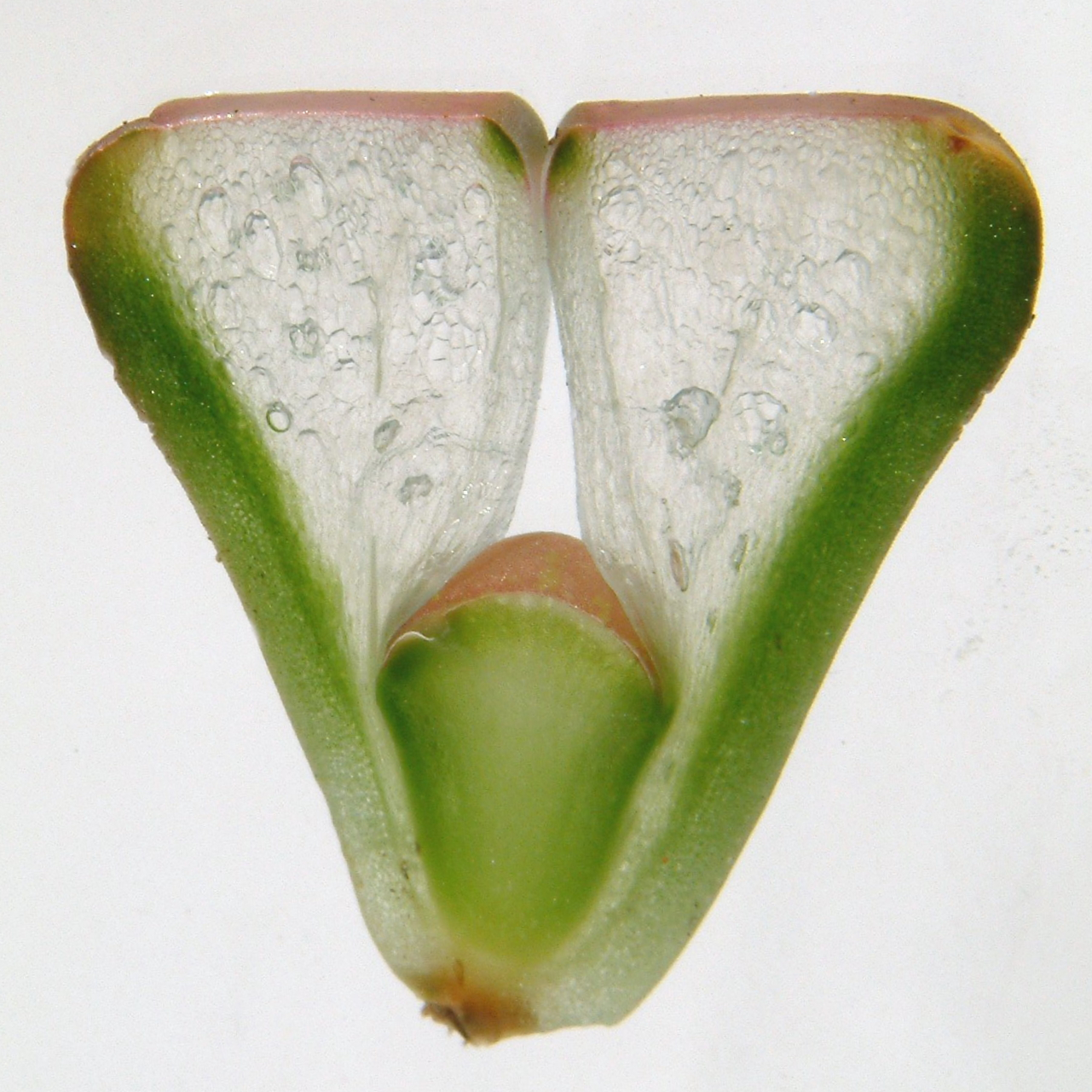
Longitudinal section of a Lithops plant, showing the epidermal window at the top, the translucent succulent tissue, the green photosynthetic tissue, and the decussate budding leaves growing between the mature leaves

The most startling adaptation of Lithops is the colouring of the leaves. The leaves are fenestrated, and the epidermal windows are patterned in various shades of cream, grey, and brown, with darker windowed areas, dots, and red lines, according to species and local conditions. The markings function as remarkable camouflage for the plant in its typically stony environment. As is typical of a window plant, the green tissue lines the inside of the leaves and is covered with translucent tissue beneath the epidermal windows.

Lithops are obligate outcrossers and require pollination from a separate plant. Like most mesembs, Lithops fruit is a dry capsule that opens when it becomes wet; some seeds may be ejected by falling raindrops, and the capsule re-closes when it dries out. Capsules may also sometimes detach and be distributed intact, or may disintegrate after several years.

== Distribution ==
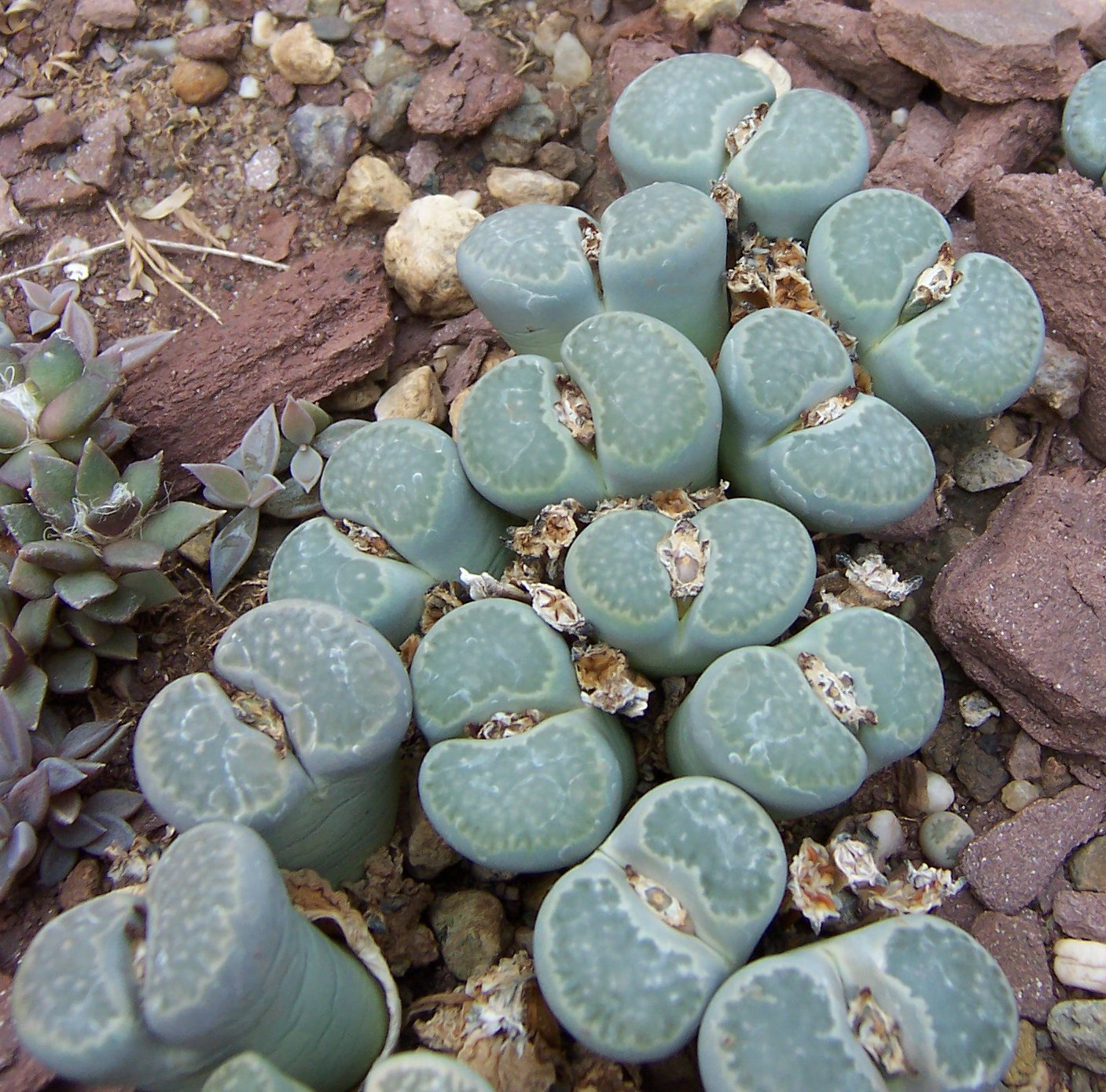
Large stand of Lithops salicola

Lithops occur naturally across wide areas of Namibia and South Africa, as well as small bordering areas in Botswana and possibly Angola, from sea level to high mountains. Nearly a thousand individual populations are documented, each covering just a small area of dry grassland, veld, or bare rocky ground. Different Lithops species are preferentially found in particular environments, usually restricted to a particular type of rock. Lithops have not naturalised outside this region.

Rainfall in Lithops habitats ranges from approximately 700 mm/year to near zero. Rainfall patterns range from exclusively summer rain to exclusively winter rain, with a few species relying almost entirely on dew formation for moisture. Temperatures are usually hot in summer and cool to cold in winter, but one species is found right at the coast with very moderate temperatures year round.

== Cultivation ==
Group of Lithops sp. dividing and producing new leaf growth

Lithops are popular house plants and many specialist succulent growers maintain collections. Seeds and plants are widely available in shops and over the internet. They are relatively easy to grow and care for if given sufficient sun and kept in well-draining soil. Normal treatment in mild temperate climates is to keep them completely dry during winter, watering only when the old leaves have dried up and are replaced by a new leaf pair. Watering continues through autumn, when the plants flower, and then stops for winter. The best results are obtained in an environment with additional heat such as a greenhouse. In hotter climates, Lithops will have a summer dormancy when they should be kept mostly dry, and they may require some water in winter. In tropical climates, Lithops can be grown primarily in winter with a long summer dormancy. In all conditions, Lithops will be most active and need most water during autumn and most species will flower at approximately the same time.

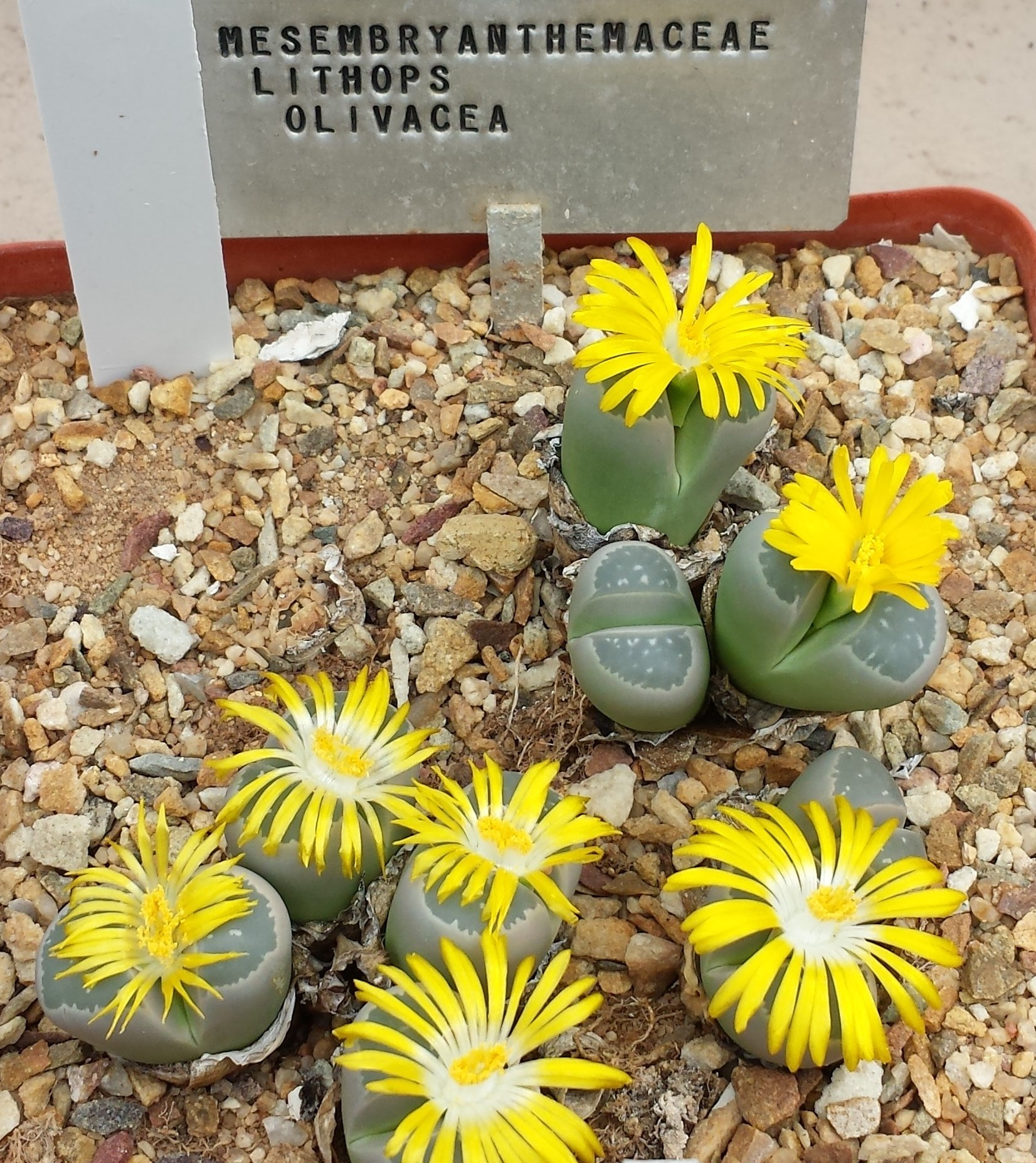
Lithops olivacea

Lithops thrive best in a coarse, well-drained substrate. Any soil that retains too much water will cause the plants to burst their skins as they over-expand. Plants grown in strong light will develop hard strongly coloured skins which are resistant to damage and rot, although persistent overwatering will still be fatal. Excessive heat will kill potted plants as they cannot cool themselves by transpiration and rely on staying buried in cool soil below the surface. Commercial growers mix a mild fungicide or weak strength horticultural sulfur into the plant's water to prevent rotting. Lithops are sensitive to watering during hot weather, which can cause the plants to rot; in habitat the plants are often dormant when the temperatures are high, doing most of their growing during the cool months of the year. Low light levels will make the plants highly susceptible to rotting and fungal infection.

In the United Kingdom the following species have gained the Royal Horticultural Society's Award of Garden Merit:

- Lithops karasmontana
- Lithops olivacea
- Lithops pseudotruncatella
- Lithops salicola
- Lithops schwantesii

== Cultivars ==
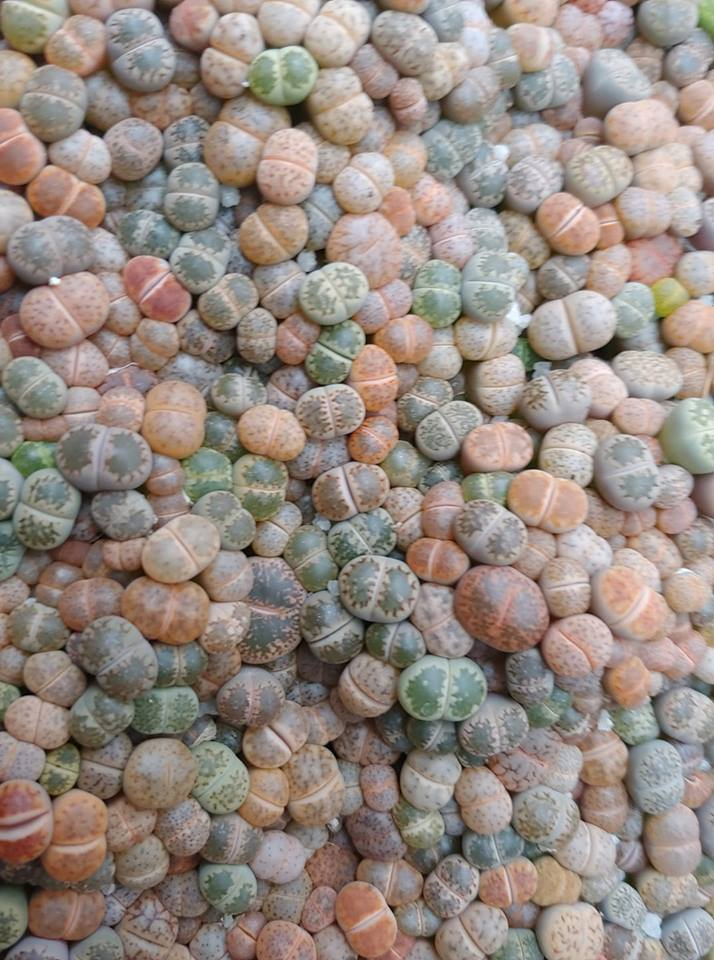
Numerous cultivated Lithops seedlings

Mr Keith Green was appointed International Cultivar Registration Authority for Lithops in 2013, and recognises over 100 registered cultivars.

Since Lithops is mostly propagated by seed, cultivars require to be stabilised as seed strains. Most cultivars are either abnormally green or abnormally red plants, lacking most of the normal leaf pigments. Some were initially found as isolated unusual plants in habitat, but increasingly have arisen from cultivation, sometimes by deliberately selecting mildly-coloured plants to achieve intense colours for a cultivar. The term "aberrant colour form" (acf.) has been used for these unusually-coloured Lithops.

There are also so-called "pattern cultivars" of Lithops, seed strains which have been selectively-bred or stabilised from isolated unusual plants to have intensified or unusual leaf patterns, and sometimes unusual flowers. In some cases, these are hybrids.

=== Propagation ===
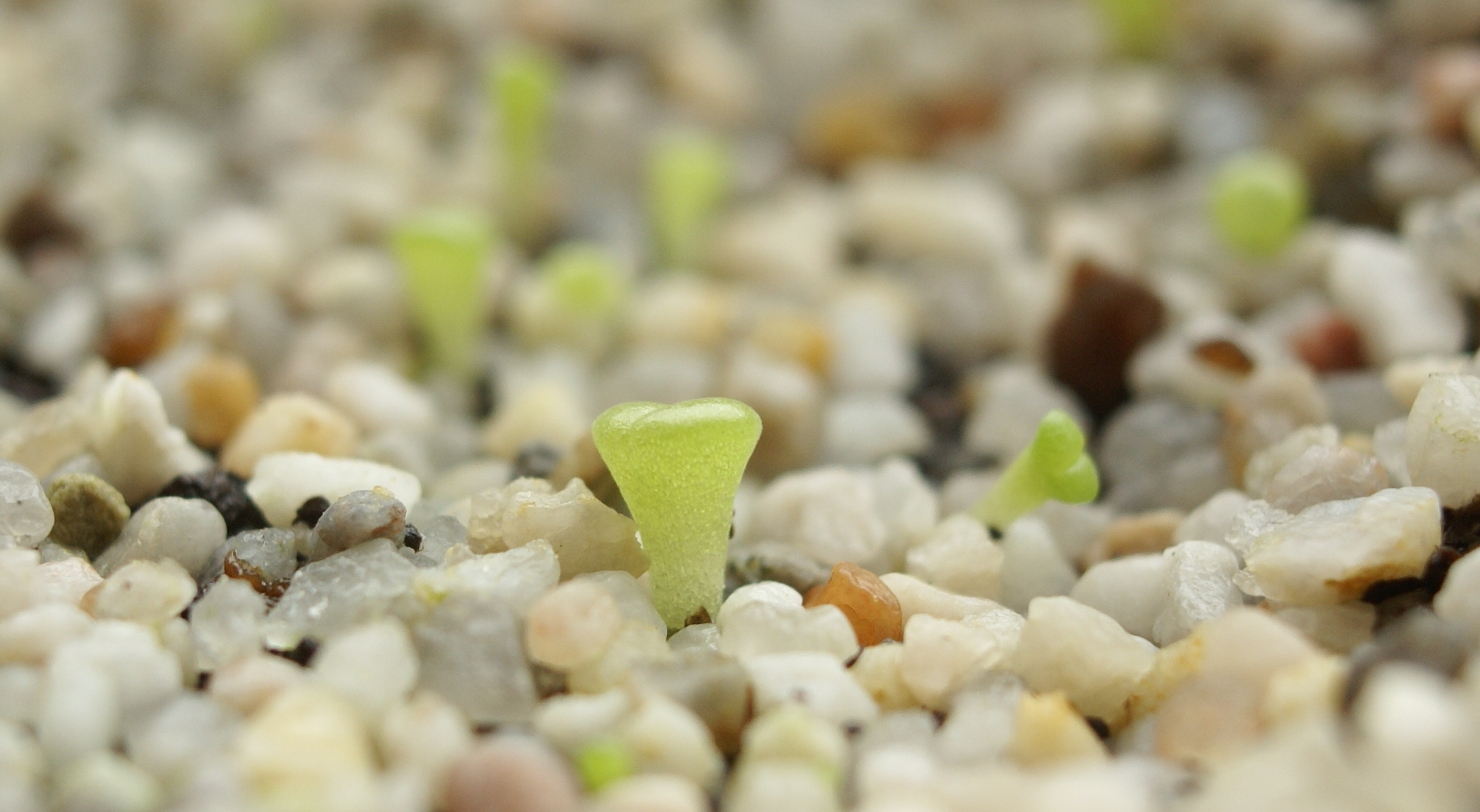
Lithops seedlings

Propagation of Lithops is by seed or cuttings. Cuttings can only be used to produce new plants after a plant has naturally divided to form multiple heads, so most propagation is by seed. Lithops can readily be pollinated by hand if two separate clones of a species flower at the same time, and seed will be ripe about 9 months later. Seed is easy to germinate, but the seedlings are small and vulnerable for the first year or two, and will not flower until at least two or three years old.

== Conservation status ==
At least half of the species listed in the Red List of South African Plants are classified as critically endangered, endangered, or threatened for various reasons, including poaching for the succulent horticultural trade, habitat degradation, and decreased or restricted range due to urban and agriculture expansion.

Species	Conservation status
Lithops aucampiae	VU
Lithops coleorum	VU
Lithops dinteri	VU
Lithops divergens	NT
Lithops dorotheae	EN
Lithops geyeri	Rare
Lithops helmutii	VU
Lithops herrei	VU
Lithops lesliei subsp. burchellii	NT
Lithops lesliei subsp. lesliei	VU
Lithops meyeri	VU
Lithops naureeniae	VU
Lithops olivacea	VU
Lithops otzeniana	VU
Lithops salicola	NT
Lithops viridis	VU
Lithops werneri	CR

== History ==
Seven-day time-lapse

The first scientific description of Lithops was made by botanist and artist William John Burchell, explorer of South Africa, although he called it Mesembryanthemum turbiniforme. In 1811, Burchell discovered a specimen when picking up a "curiously shaped pebble" from the ground. Unfortunately the documented physical description was not detailed enough to be sure which Lithops he had discovered and the name Lithops turbiniformis is no longer used, although for many years it was applied to what is now known as Lithops hookeri.

Several more Lithops were published as Mesembryanthemum species until in 1922 N E Brown started to split up the overly large genus on the basis of the capsules. The genus Lithops was created and dozens more species were published in the following decades. Brown, Gustav Schwantes, Kurt Dinter, Gert Nel, and Louisa Bolus continued to document Lithops from across southern Africa, but there was little consensus on the relationships between them, or even which populations should be grouped as species. As recently as the 1950s, the genus remained rather unknown in cultivation and was not well understood taxonomically.

In the 1950s, Desmond and Naureen Cole began to study Lithops. Together, the couple visited nearly all natural habitats of the different lithops populations and collected samples from approximately 400. They document and identify them, assigning a number, which is now known as the Cole number still used today all around the world. They studied and revised the genus, in 1988 publishing a definitive book (Lithops: Flowering Stones) describing the species, subspecies, and varieties which have been accepted ever since.

Because their camouflage is so effective, new species continue to be discovered. Recent discoveries include L. coleorum in 1994, L. hermetica in 2000, and L. amicorum in 2006.

== Taxonomy ==
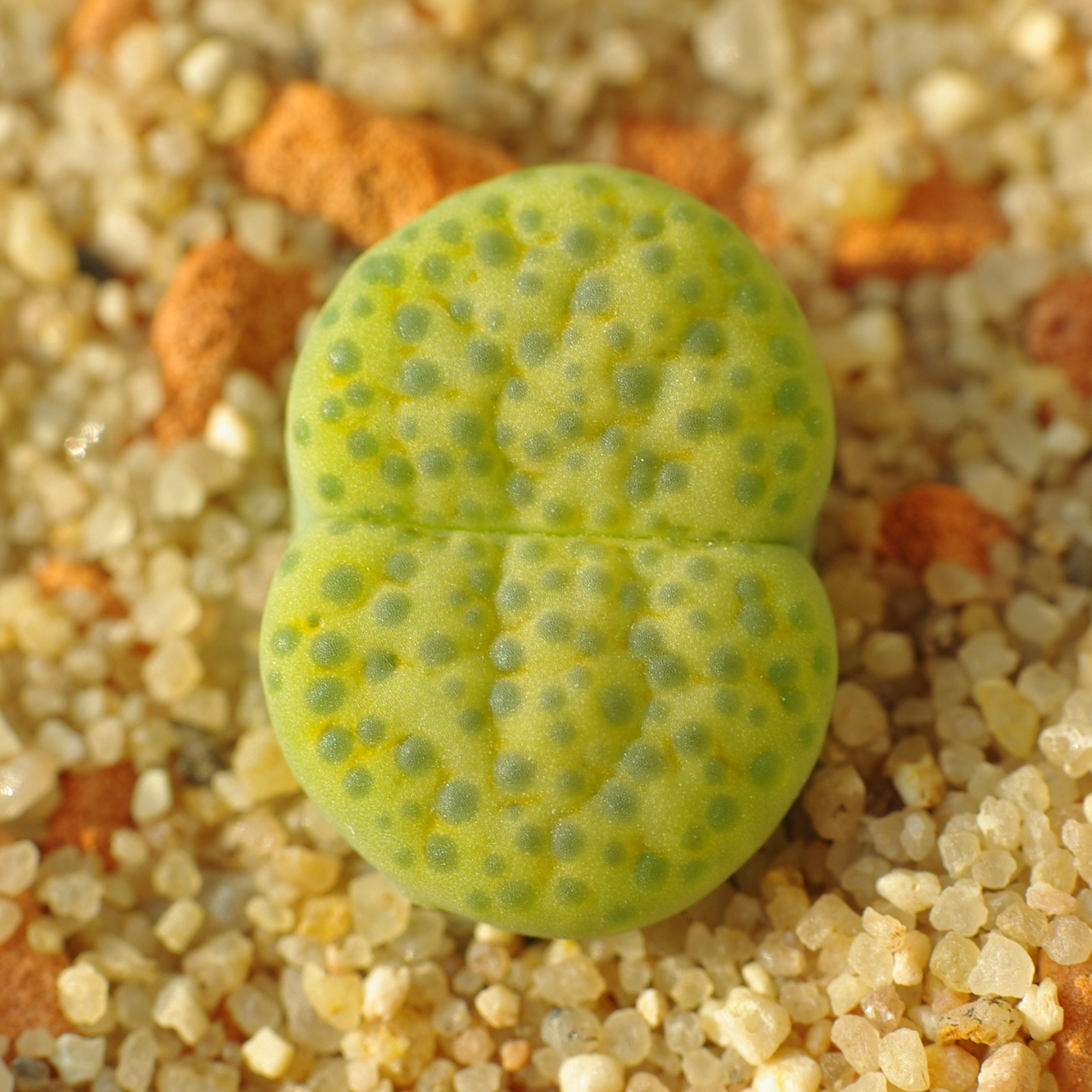
Lithops fulviceps 'Aurea', green-bodied cultivar

Many of the species listed have named subspecies or varieties and some have many regional forms identified by old names or habitat locations. Identification of species is primarily by flower colour and leaf patterns. The species list here follows Cole & Cole (2006).

Lithops
Specific epithet	Meaning
amicorum	of the friends
aucampiae	named after Juanita Aucamp
bromfieldii	named after H. Bromfield
coleorum	named after Desmond & Naureen Cole
comptonii	named after Prof. Robert Harold Compton
dinteri	named after Moritz Kurt Dinter
divergens	divergent lobes
dorotheae	named after Dorothea Huyssteen
francisci	named after Frantz de Laet
fulviceps	tawny head
gesineae	named after Gesine de Boer
geyeri	named after Albertus Geyer
gracilidelineata	thin lined
hallii	named after Harry Hall
helmutii	named after Helmut Meyer
hermetica	named after the 'hermetically sealed' location, Sperrgebiet
herrei	named after Adolar 'Hans' Herre
hookeri	named after Sir Joseph Hooker
julii	named after Julius Derenberg
karasmontana	named after the Great Karas Mountains
lesliei	named after T. N. Leslie
localis	of a place
marmorata	marbled
meyeri	named after Rev. Gottlieb Meyer
naureeniae	named after Naureen Cole
olivacea	olive-green
optica	eye-like
otzeniana	named after M. Otzen
pseudotruncatella	had been confused with Conophytum truncatum
ruschiorum	named after Rusch family
salicola	salt-dweller
schwantesii	named after Gustav Schwantes
vallis-mariae	named after the location Mariental (Latinised)
verruculosa	warty
villetii	named after C. T. Villet
viridis	green
werneri	named after Werner Triebner

Although the species, subspecies, and varieties published by Cole & Cole largely remain accepted and in widespread use, some variations have been published by other authors. Published changes since 2006 include:

- reducing L. amicorum to a subspecies of L. karasmontana; combining L. karasmontana ssp. bella and ssp. eberlanzii into one subspecies; and combining L. herrei with L. optica.
- raising L. dendritica and L. eberlanzii to species level and dropping all the separate varieties of L. karasmontana.
- raising L. bella, L. burchellii, L. euniceae, and L. glaudinae to species level; combining L. dorotheae and L schwantesii var. marthae under L. dinteri; combining L. francisci, L. gesinae, and L. hermetica; combining L. geyeri under L. herrei; dropping separate subspecies of L. julii and L. gracilidelineata; splitting ssp. archerae, dendritica and groendrayensis from L. pseudotruncatella as L. dendritica; and dropping separate varieties under L. villetii.

One study of non-coding chloroplast DNA (trnS-trnG intergenic spacer), nuclear ribosomal internal transcribed spacer (nrITS) sequences and AFLP data found that Lithops was not monophyletic since Dinteranthus, Schwantesia, and Lapidaria were involved. It identified 9 clades which did not closely frame the accepted 37 species.

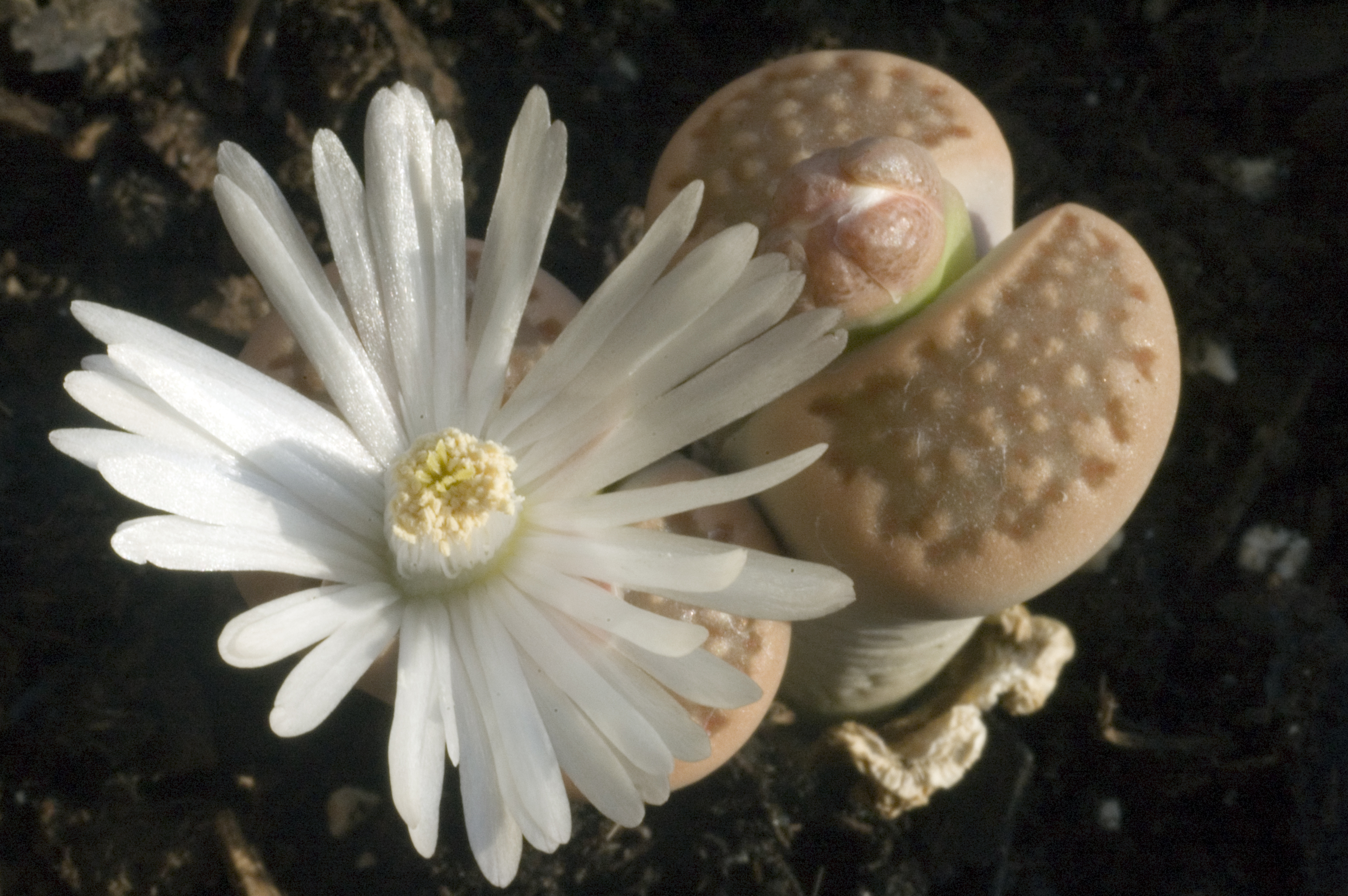
Lithops sp. Blooms emerge between the leaves in autumn.

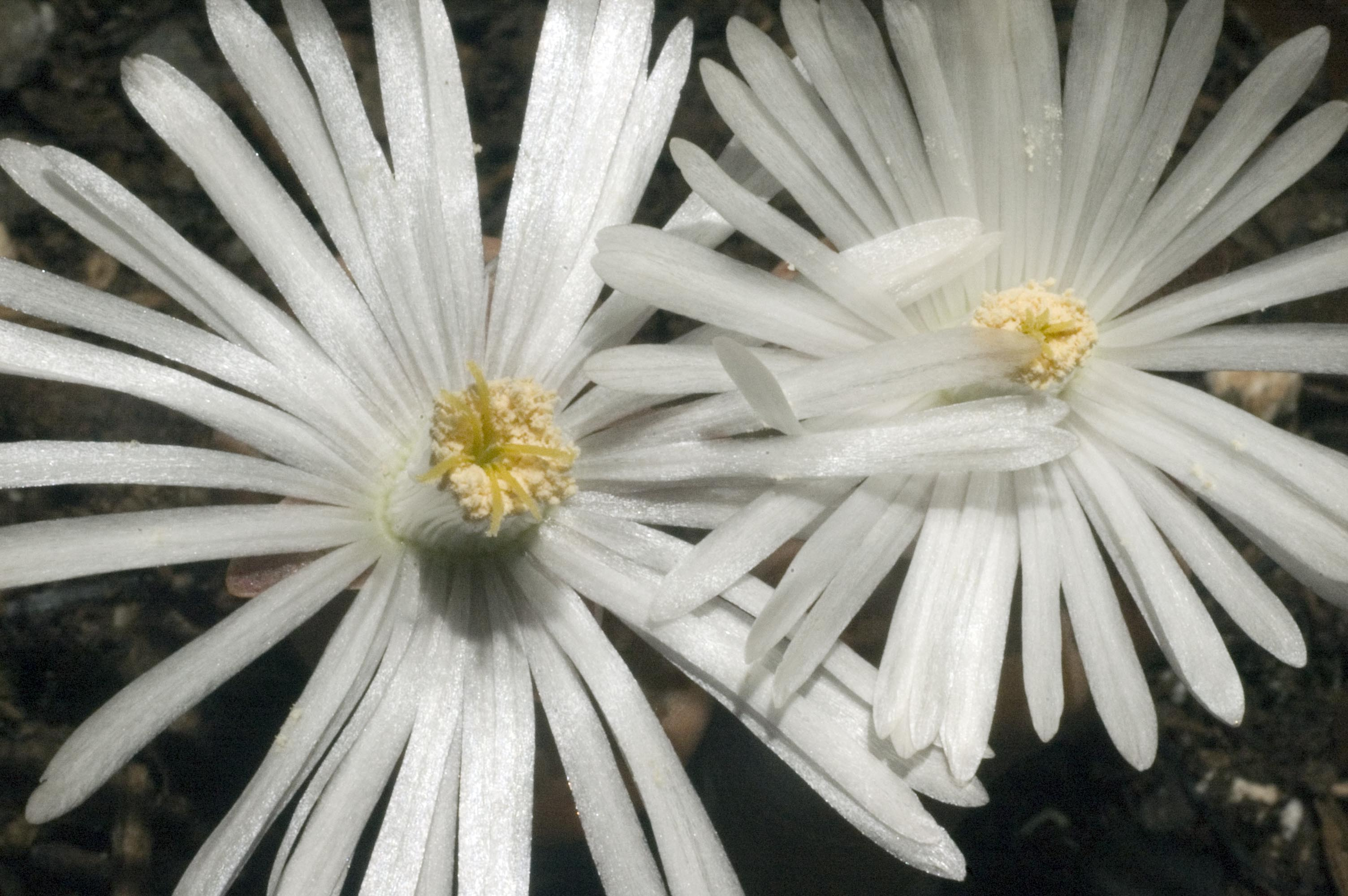
Lithops sp. Some species have flowers large enough to obscure the leaves. They open in the afternoon and close in the evening.

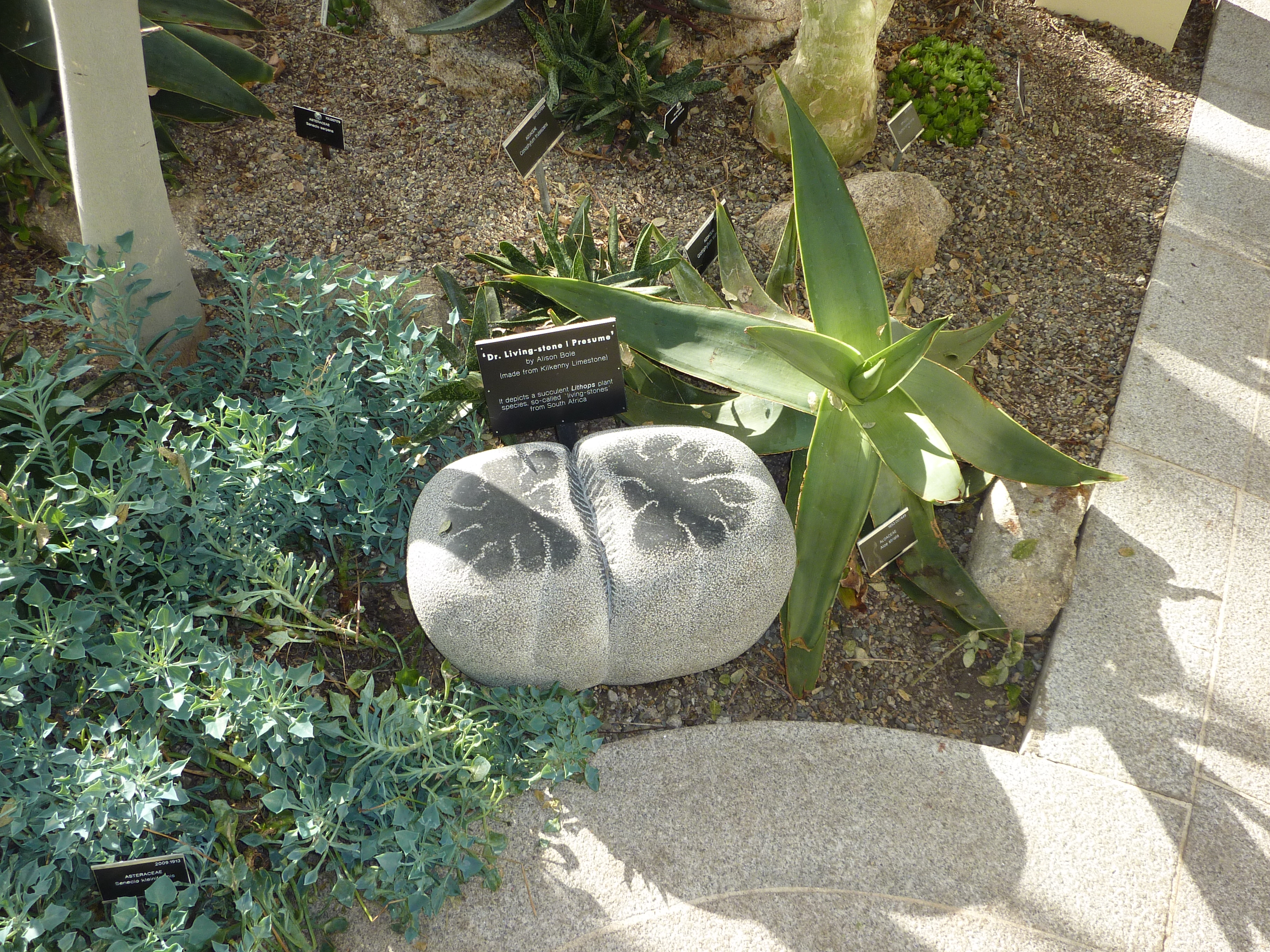
Sculpture of lithops, National Botanical Gardens of Ireland

== Bibliography ==
- Jainta, Harald (2017). Wild Lithops. Klaus Hess Verlag. ISBN 978-3-933117-93-9.
- Cole, Desmond T (1988). Lithops—Flowering Stones. Acorn Books. ISBN 0-620-09678-0.
- Cole, Desmond; Cole, Naureen (2005). Lithops—Flowering Stones. Cactus & Co. ISBN 88-900511-7-5.
- Hammer, Steven (1999). Lithops: Treasures of the Veld. BCCS. ISBN 0-902099-64-7.
- Schwantes, Gustav (1957). Flowering Stones and Mid-day Flowers. London: Ernst Benn.
