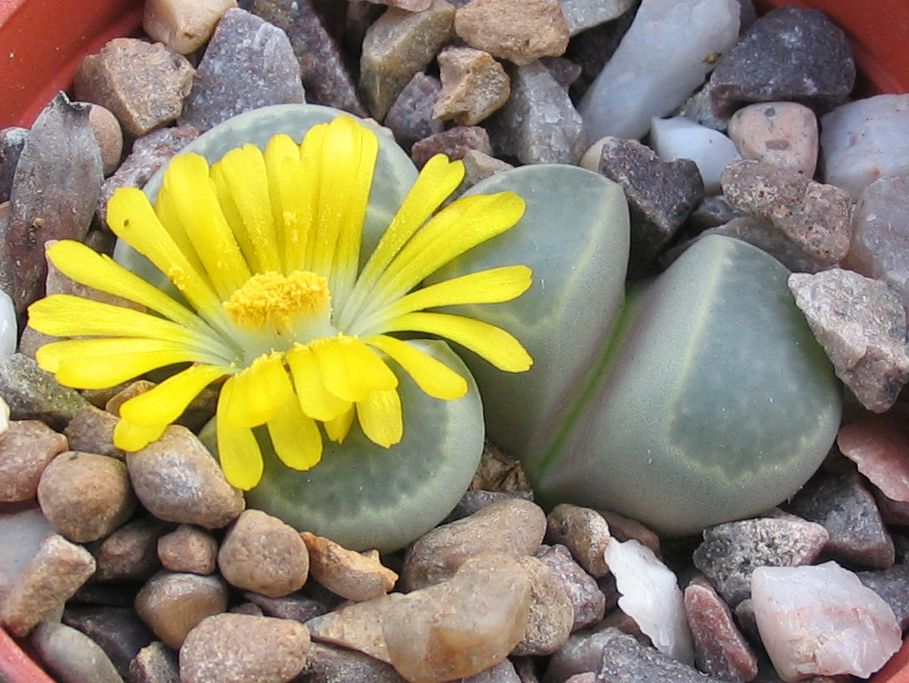
- Lithops viridis in cultivation, showing two leaf pairs

Scientific classification
- Kingdom: Plantae
- Clade: Tracheophytes
- Clade: Angiosperms
- Clade: Eudicots
- Order: Caryophyllales
- Family: Aizoaceae
- Genus: Lithops
- Species: L. viridis

Binomial name
- Lithops viridis H.A.Lückh.

= Lithops viridis =

Species of plant

Lithops viridis is a species of plant in the family Aizoaceae.

== Distribution ==
Found only in a small area south of Loerisfontein, Lithops viridis is endemic to the Northern Cape Province of South Africa. It grows on shale in an area that receives not much more than 100 mm of rain annually.

== Description ==
Lithops viridis is named for its greenness, not a common colour for Lithops. As with all Lithops, plants are virtually stemless with just two opposite leaves on each head, partly fused to form a roughly conical shape. The leaves grow partly to mostly buried beneath the surface stones, with the leaf tips admitting light to the photosynthetic leaf interiors. As well as being green, it is relatively plain with generally open windows, with islands in the windows vague at best, and none of the dots or red markings found in many other species. It is relatively tall for a Lithops, with somewhat divergent leave having convex tips. Some plants can show a reddish shading at times.

The flowers appear in autumn and are yellow, often with a noticeably white centre. They have two small bracts, nearly always have five calyx lobes, and many petaloid staminodes. Flowers emerge from the fissure between leaf pairs, each with two small bracts. After pollination a capsule forms, taking until the next summer to ripen. Ripe capsules are hygroscopic, with five flaps on the top of the capsule opening in response to water. Some seeds may be ejected by raindrops, others may be retained and the capsules close when they dry out. Seeds are small, less than a millimetre across.

L. viridis is relatively unusual amongst Lithops species in having no named cultivars.
