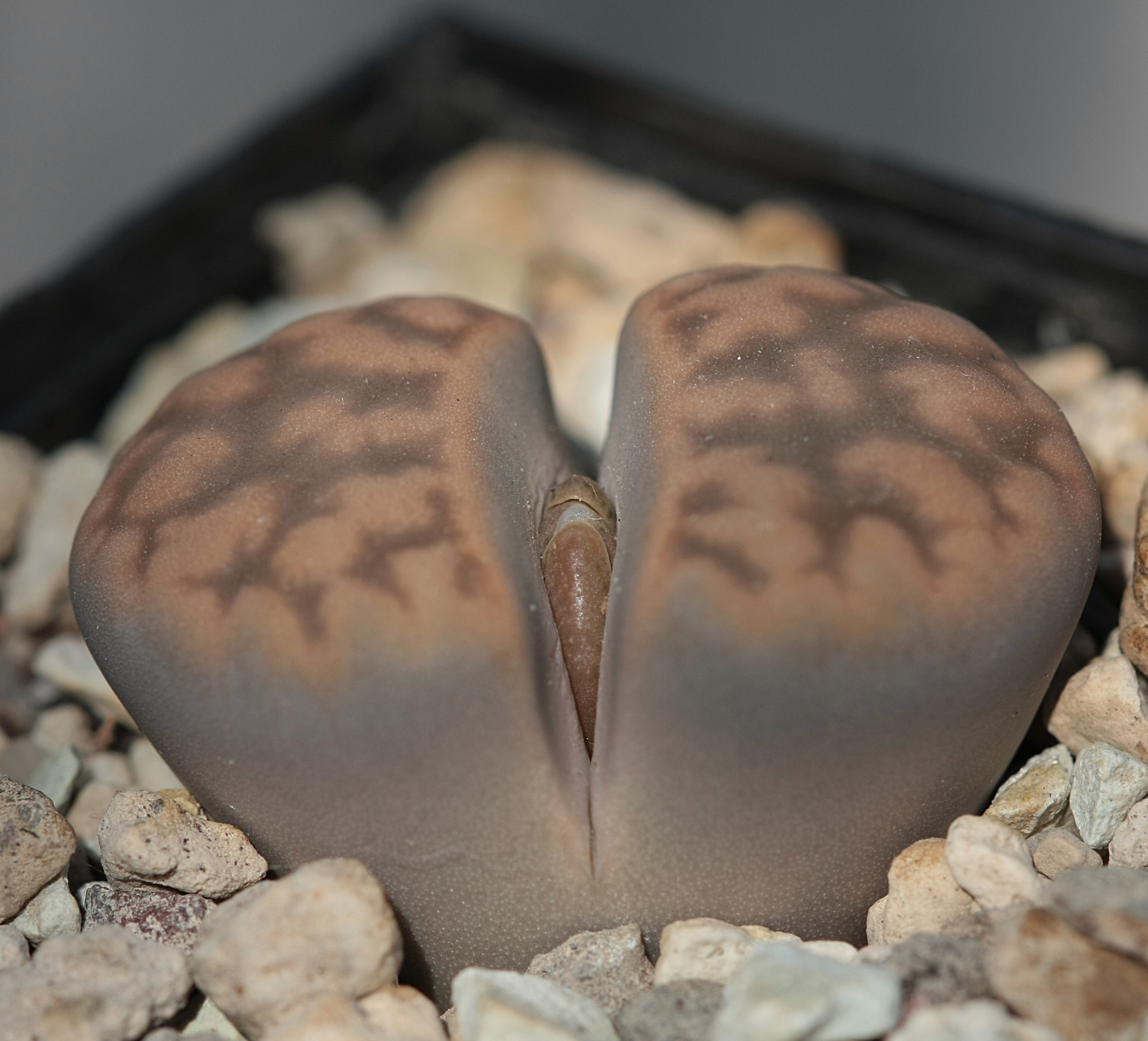
- Lithops hallii preparing to sprout a flower from between its leaves

Scientific classification
- Kingdom: Plantae
- Clade: Tracheophytes
- Clade: Angiosperms
- Clade: Eudicots
- Order: Caryophyllales
- Family: Aizoaceae
- Genus: Lithops
- Species: L. hallii

Binomial name
- Lithops hallii de Boer

= Lithops hallii =

Species of succulent

Lithops hallii is a species of living stone (Lithops). It is native to the northern Cape Provinces of South Africa. It is a species of the genus Lithops under the family Aizoaceae.

== Description ==
The leaves are reddish-brown with milky whites or grays, and have channels of blood-red to dark brown running along the top of the leaves. Flowers are white and sprout from the fissure between the two leaves.
