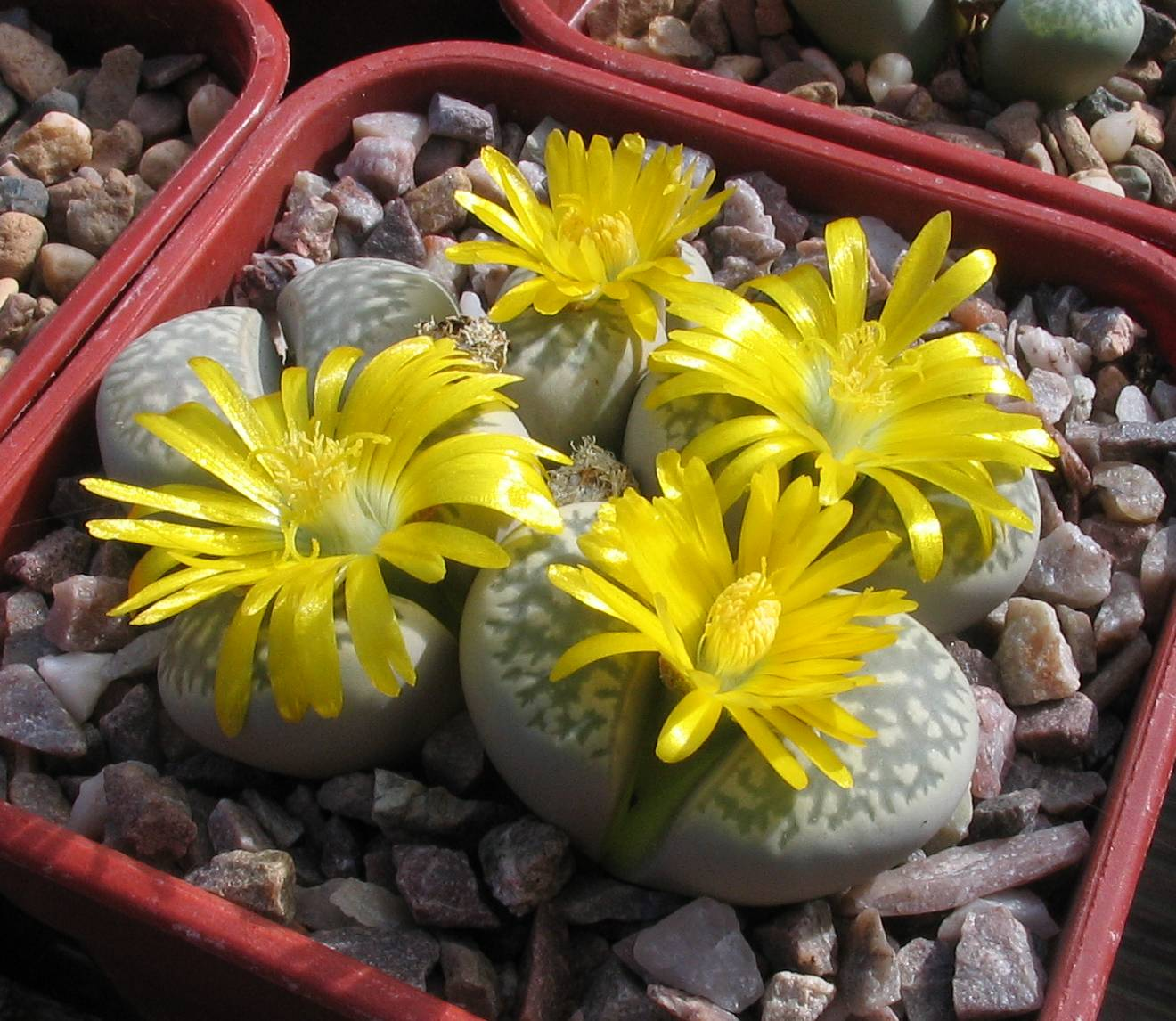

Scientific classification
- Kingdom: Plantae
- Clade: Tracheophytes
- Clade: Angiosperms
- Clade: Eudicots
- Order: Caryophyllales
- Family: Aizoaceae
- Genus: Lithops
- Species: L. geyeri

Binomial name
- Lithops geyeri Nel

= Lithops geyeri =

Species of plant

Lithops geyeri is a species of pebble plant. It is native to South Africa.

== Description ==
The succulent plant has leaves which grow in pairs. The leaves are gray or brown with tinges of green or blue. The flowers emerge from the fissure between the two leaves, and are yellow, often with a white center.
