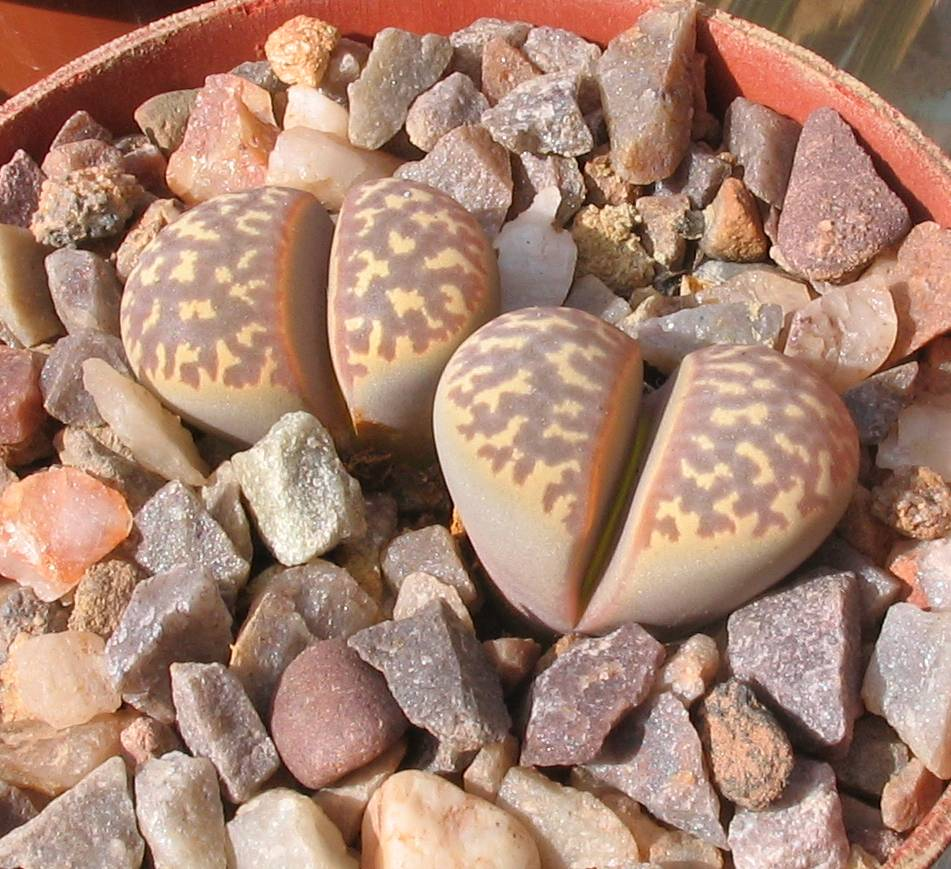
- Lithops naureeniae in cultivation

Scientific classification
- Kingdom: Plantae
- Clade: Tracheophytes
- Clade: Angiosperms
- Clade: Eudicots
- Order: Caryophyllales
- Family: Aizoaceae
- Genus: Lithops
- Species: L. naureeniae

Binomial name
- Lithops naureeniae D.T.Cole

= Lithops naureeniae =

Species of succulent

Lithops naureeniae is a species of pebble plant (Lithops), in the family Aizoaceae. It is native to the Northern Cape province of South Africa. The succulent is adapted to the desert climate in which it lives. L. naureeniae was identified in 1980 by Desmond Cole, who became involved in Lithops research in 1947, from a specimen provided to him by Bruce Bayer, curator of the Karoo Botanic Garden, having been collected by Peter V. Bruyns in Namaqualand. It is named after Cole's wife, Naureen Cole. Cole wrote:

I therefore have pleasure in dedicating it to the person who, during the last fifteen years, directly and indirectly, has contributed more to research on and knowledge of the genus Lithops than any other—my wife, Naureen

== Description ==
The succulent has pink to pale-reddish leaves, which grow in pairs of two and clump together in multiple heads. It sprouts yellow flowers with a white center.
