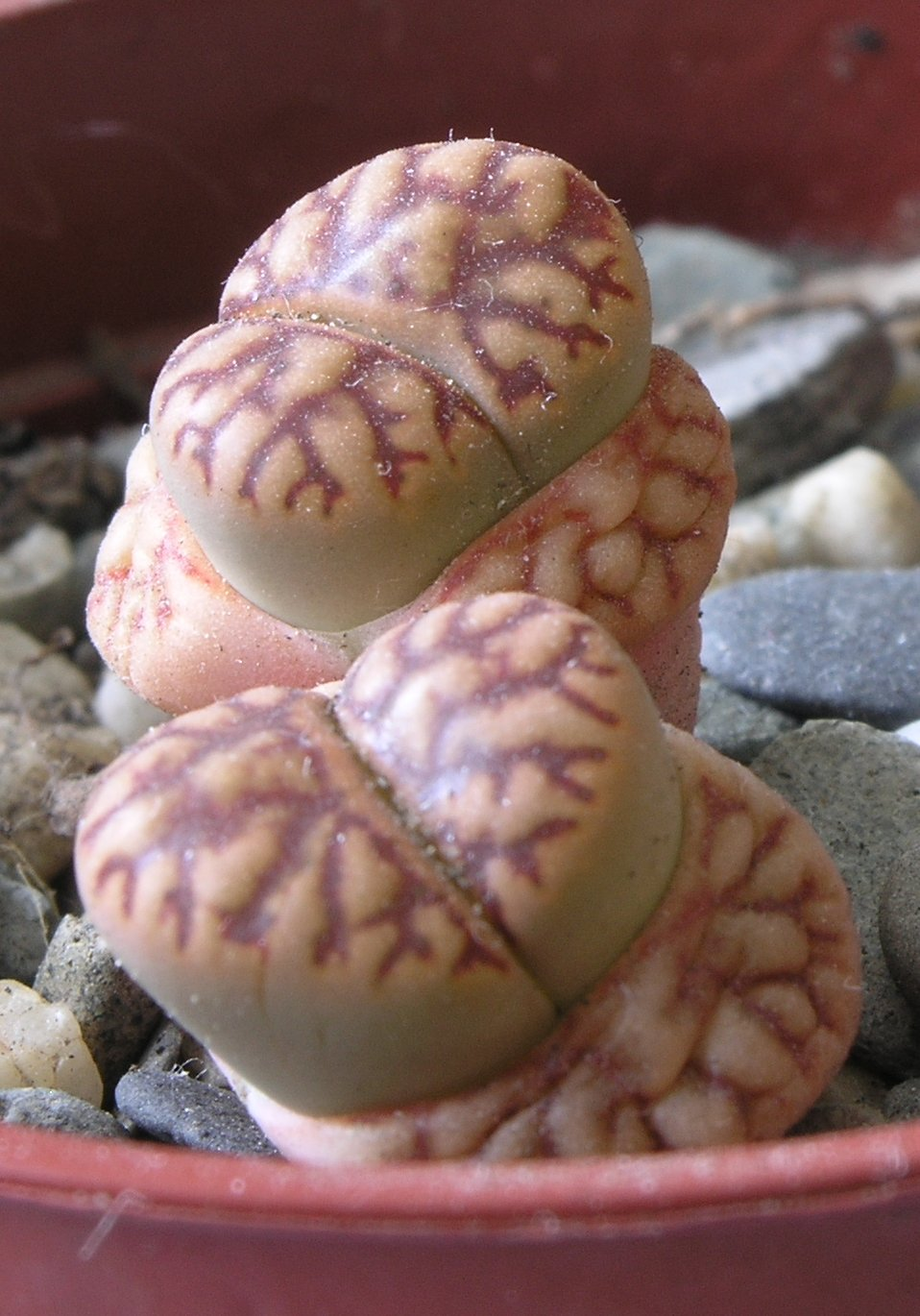
- Lithops bromfieldii

Scientific classification
- Kingdom: Plantae
- Clade: Tracheophytes
- Clade: Angiosperms
- Clade: Eudicots
- Order: Caryophyllales
- Family: Aizoaceae
- Genus: Lithops
- Species: L. bromfieldii

Binomial name
- Lithops bromfieldii L.Bolus

Synonyms
- Lithops bromfieldii f. sulphurea Y.Shimada; Lithops insularis L.Bolus; Lithops mennellii L.Bolus

= Lithops bromfieldii =

Species of succulent

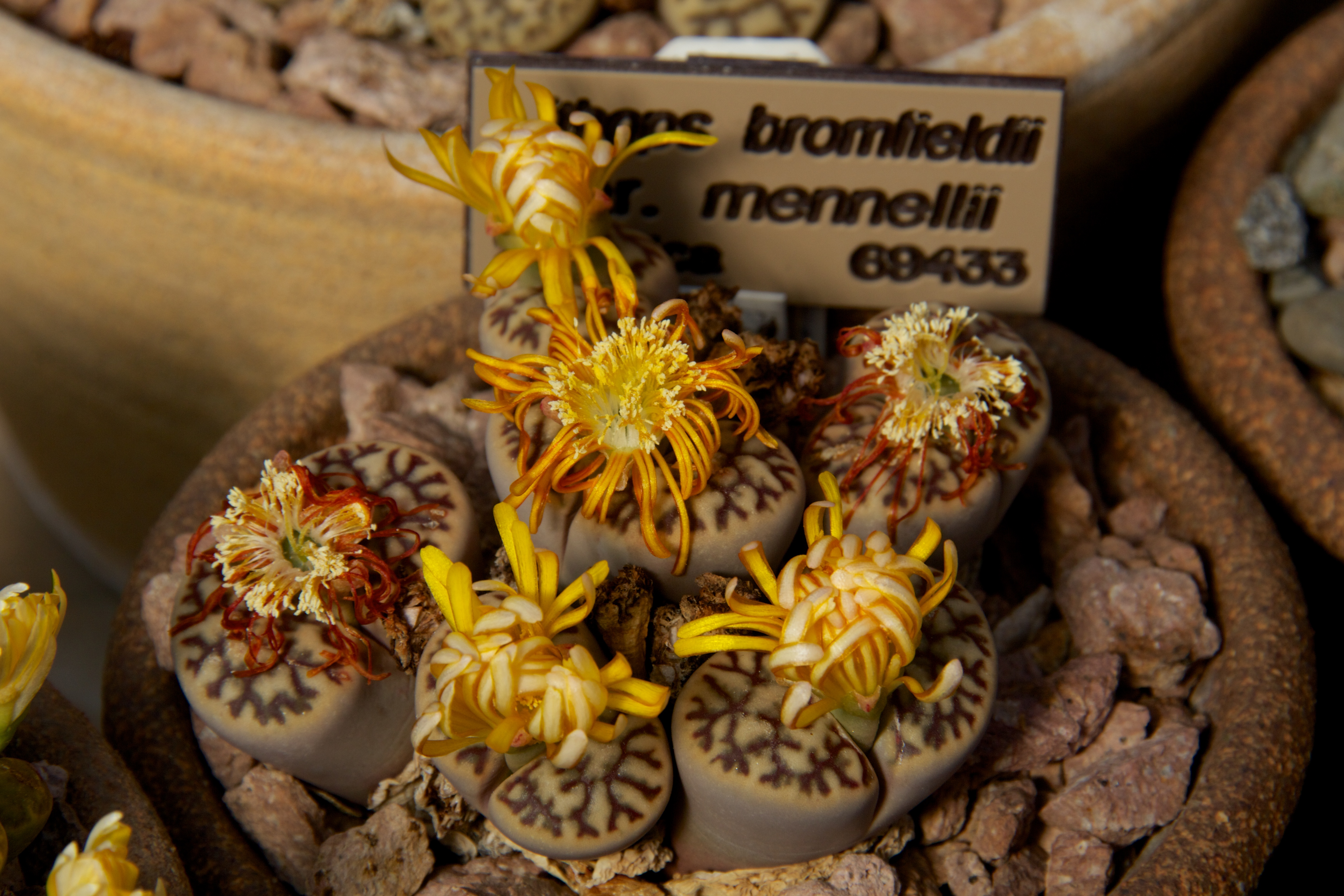
Multi-headed L. bromfieldii plant in flower

Lithops bromfieldii, also called the living stone, is a succulent plant in the genus Lithops. It is native to the Northern Cape Province of South Africa.

The plant is tan and reddish brown, and looks like stones when not in bloom. It blooms in the fall. Flowers are yellow.
