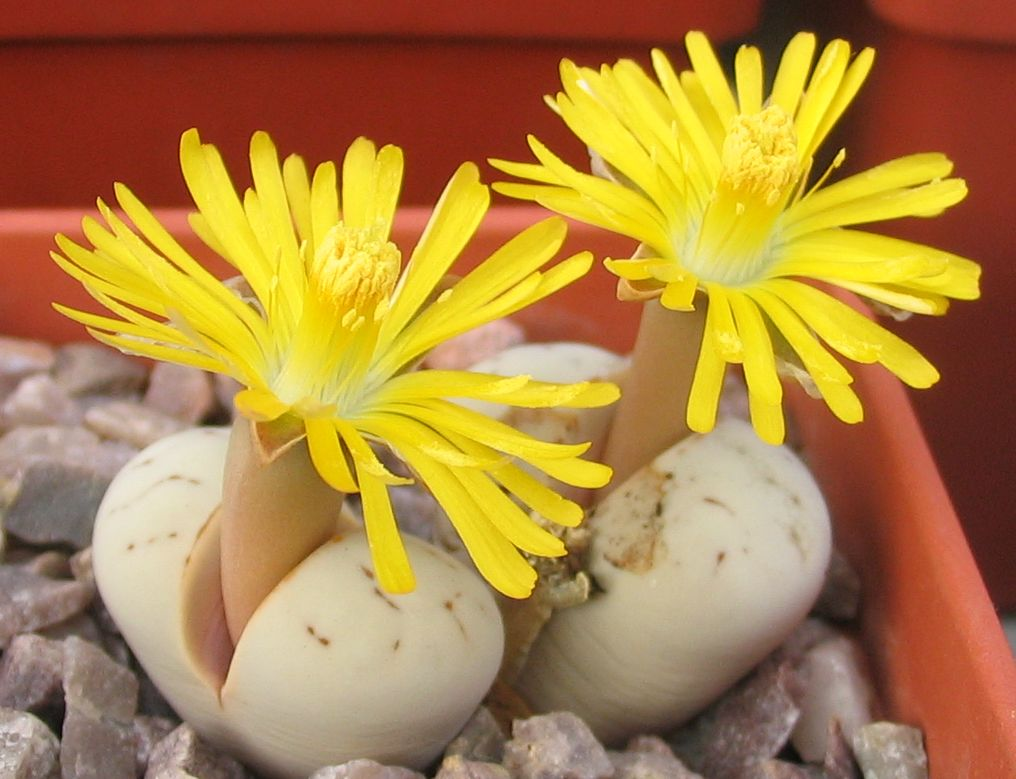
- Lithops ruschiorum in cultivation

Conservation status
- Least Concern (IUCN 3.1)

Scientific classification
- Kingdom: Plantae
- Clade: Tracheophytes
- Clade: Angiosperms
- Clade: Eudicots
- Order: Caryophyllales
- Family: Aizoaceae
- Genus: Lithops
- Species: L. ruschiorum

Binomial name
- Lithops ruschiorum (Dinter & Schwantes) N.E.Br.

= Lithops ruschiorum =

Species of succulent

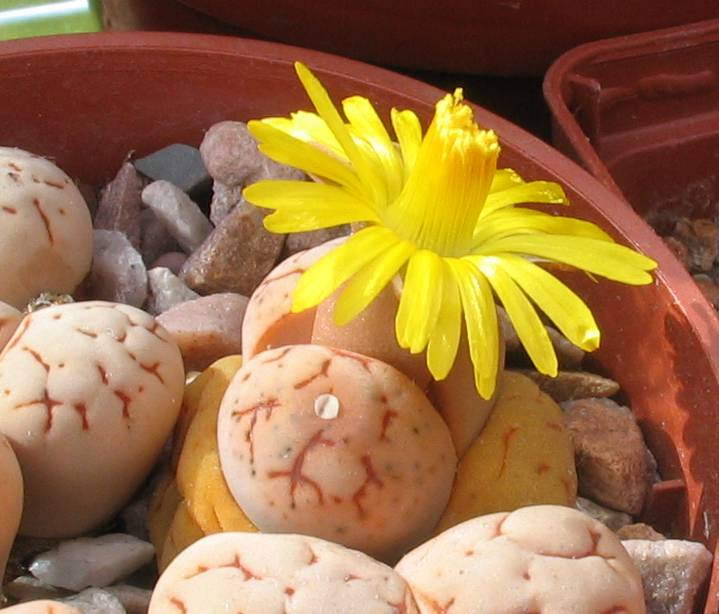
Lithops ruschiorum var. lineata in cultivation

Lithops ruschiorum is a species of plant in the family Aizoaceae. It is endemic to Namibia. Its natural habitats are rocky areas and cold desert.
