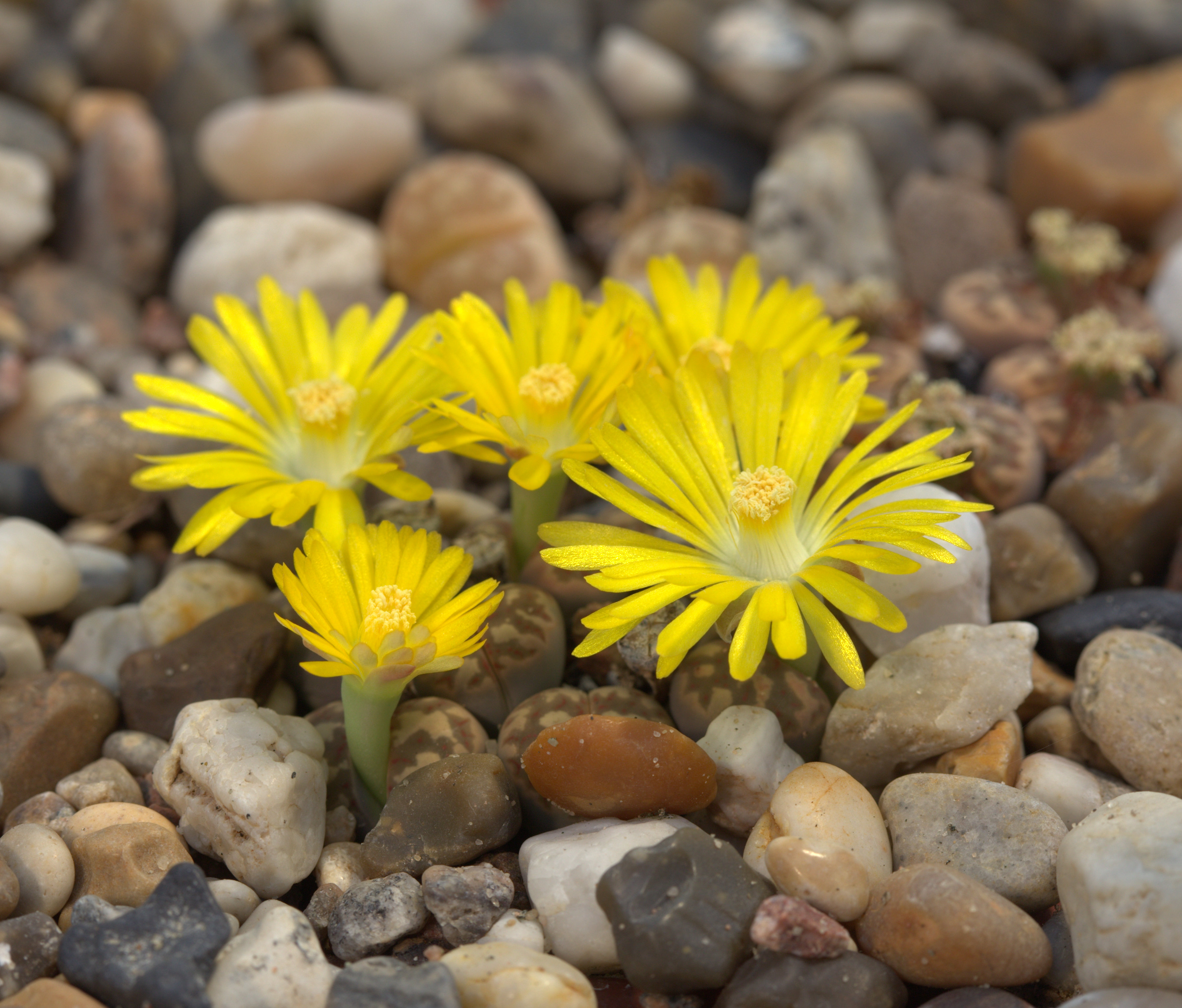
- Lithops dorotheae in Gothenburg Botanical Garden

Scientific classification
- Kingdom: Plantae
- Clade: Tracheophytes
- Clade: Angiosperms
- Clade: Eudicots
- Order: Caryophyllales
- Family: Aizoaceae
- Genus: Lithops
- Species: L. dorotheae

Binomial name
- Lithops dorotheae Nel

= Lithops dorotheae =

Species of succulent

Lithops dorotheae is a species of Lithops found in South Africa. It was named after Dorothea Huyssteen, who discovered the plant in 1935. It grows on fine-grained sheared quartz and feldspar rock containing feldspathic quartzite.
