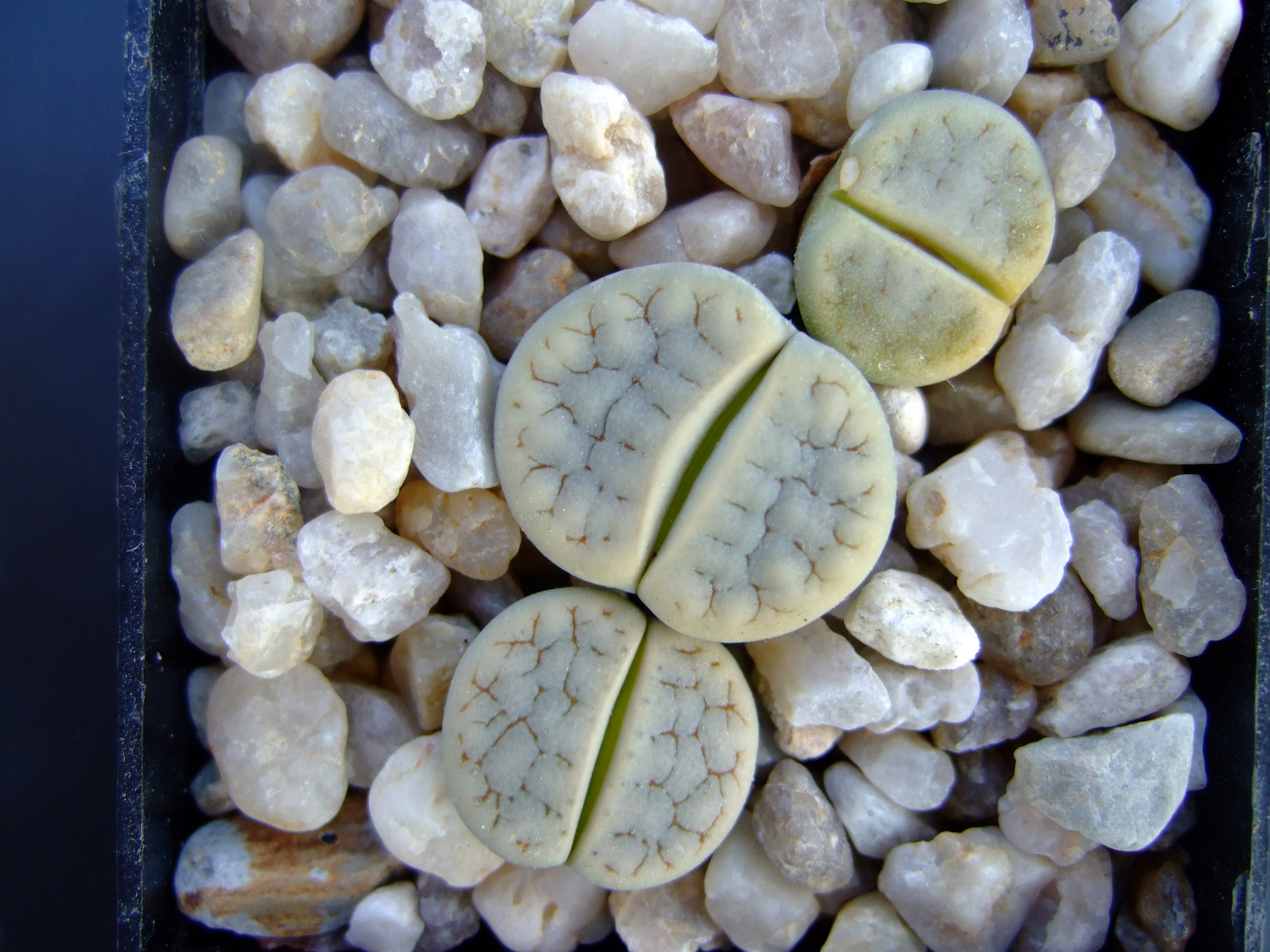

Scientific classification
- Kingdom: Plantae
- Clade: Tracheophytes
- Clade: Angiosperms
- Clade: Eudicots
- Order: Caryophyllales
- Family: Aizoaceae
- Genus: Lithops
- Species: L. gracilidelineata

Binomial name
- Lithops gracilidelineata Dinter

Synonyms
- Lithops gracilidelineata subsp. brandbergensis (de Boer) D.T.Cole; Lithops streyi Schwantes

= Lithops gracilidelineata =

Species of succulent

Lithops gracilidelineata is a species of the genus Lithops under the family Aizoaceae. The succulent plant lives in the southern region of Africa, and receives its name from the Latin words gracili (meaning slim) and linea (meaning line), combining to form the translation of "fine lined".

== Description ==
Lithops gracilidelineata has leaves growing in pairs of two, maybe sometimes forming clumps. The leaves are light colored and have a small, fine-lined pattern on top of them usually in brown, and of a random pattern. Flowers are yellow and 20–45 mm in diameter.
