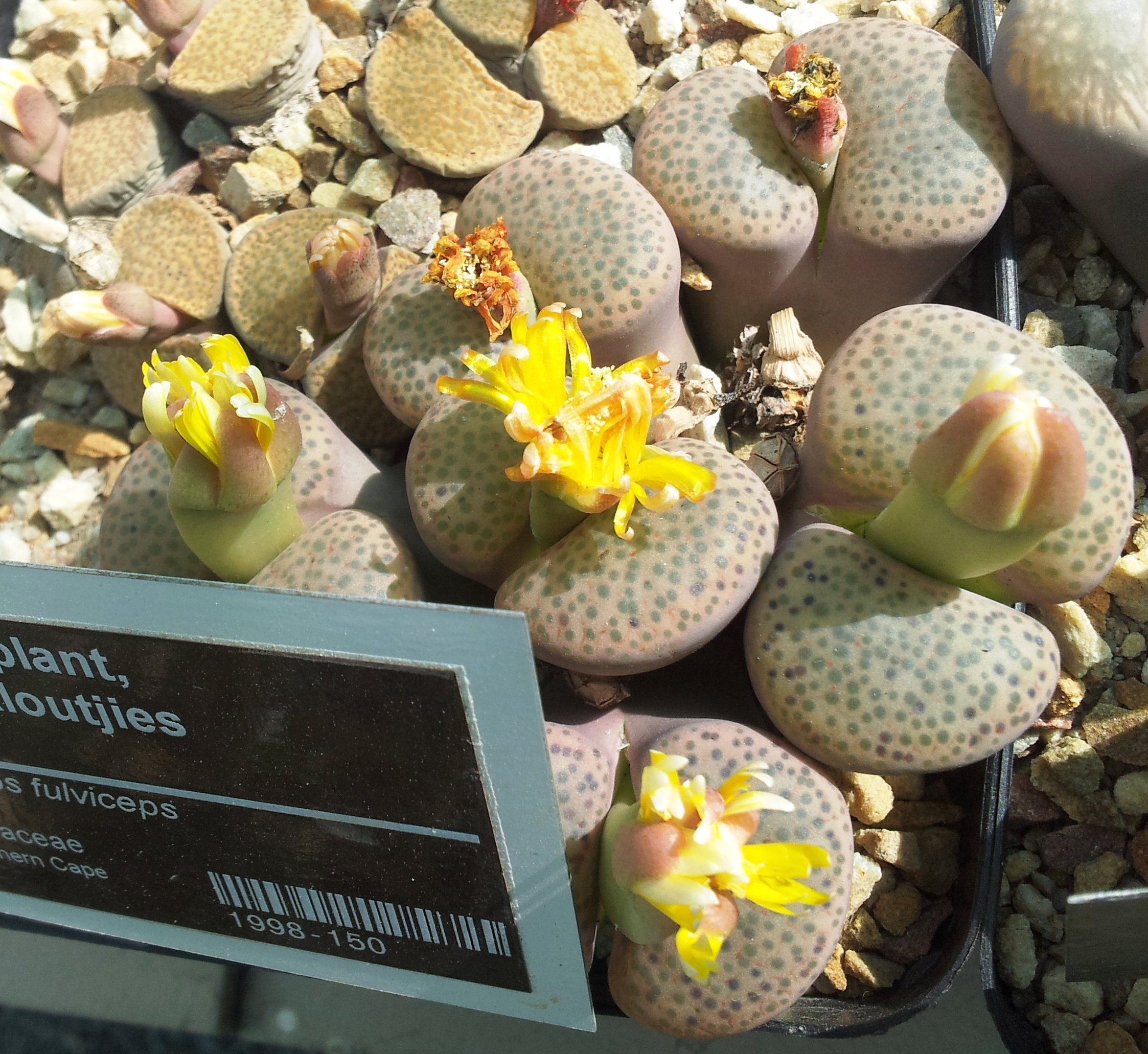

Conservation status
- Least Concern (IUCN 3.1)

Scientific classification
- Kingdom: Plantae
- Clade: Tracheophytes
- Clade: Angiosperms
- Clade: Eudicots
- Order: Caryophyllales
- Family: Aizoaceae
- Genus: Lithops
- Species: L. fulviceps

Binomial name
- Lithops fulviceps (N.E.Br.) N.E.Br.

= Lithops fulviceps =

Species of succulent

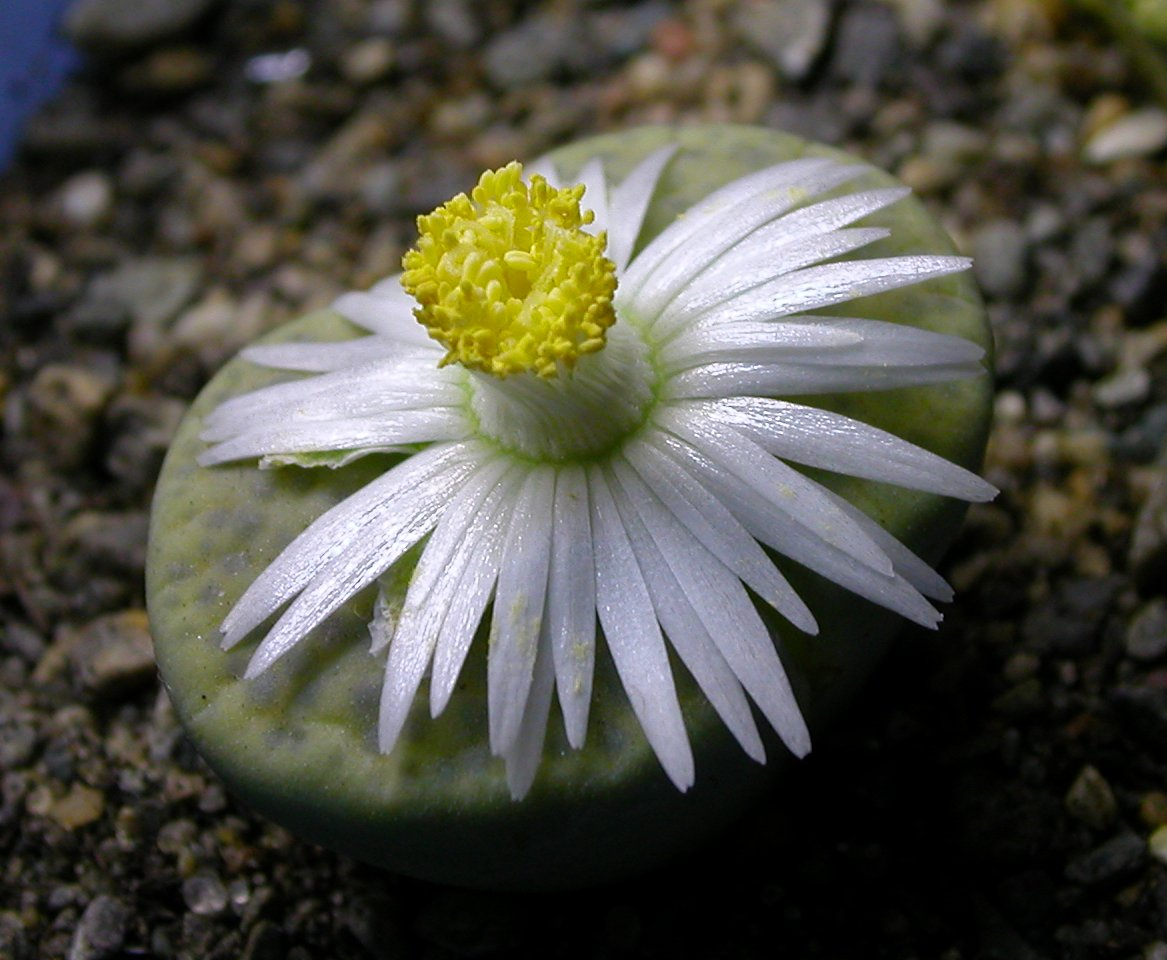
'Aurea' cultivar with greenish leaves and white flowers

Lithops fulviceps is a species of plant in the family Aizoaceae. It occurs in a small region of southern Namibia and northern South Africa. Its natural habitats are rocky areas and cold deserts. It is threatened by habitat loss.
