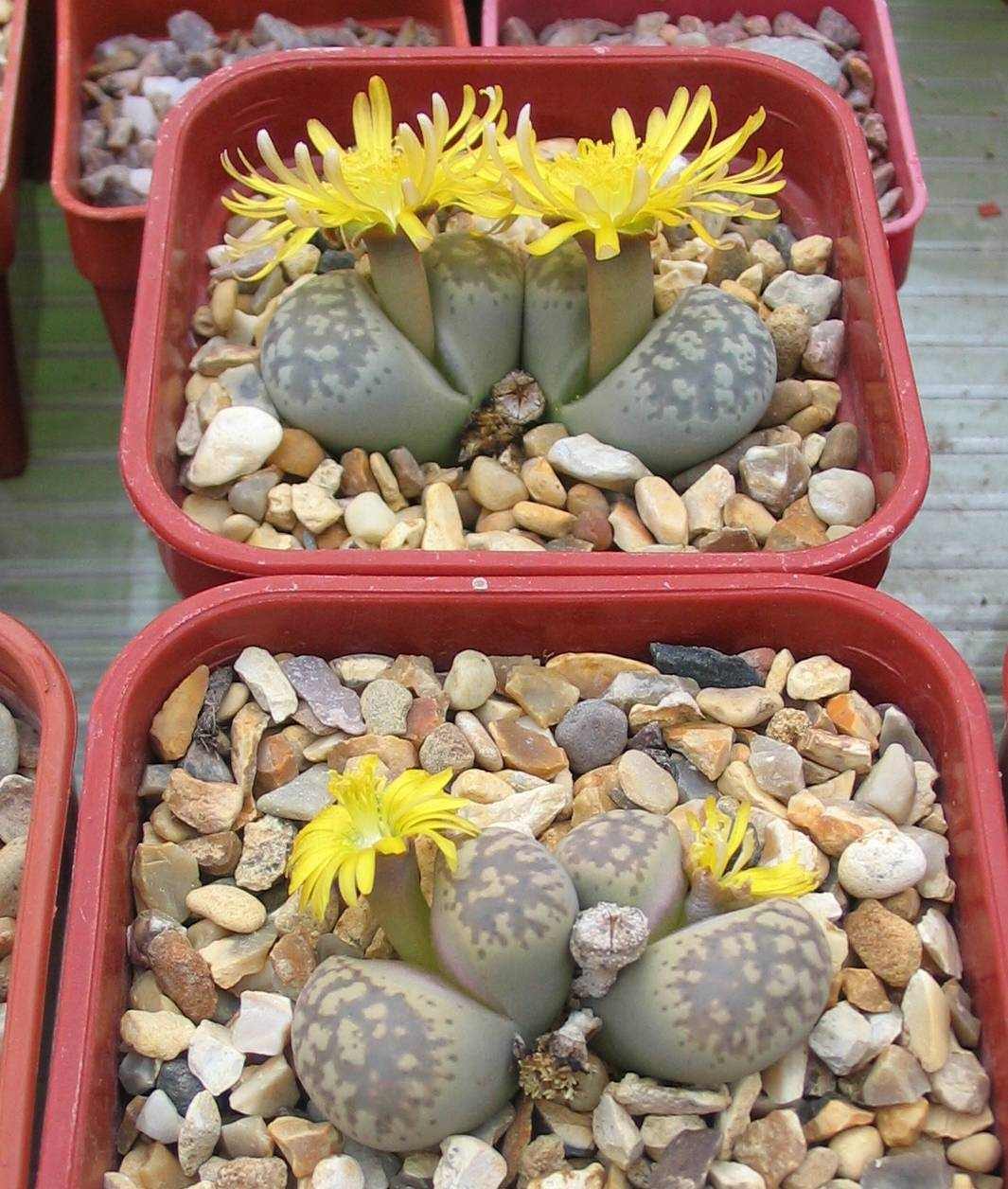
- Lithops hermetica in cultivation

Conservation status
- Vulnerable (IUCN 3.1)

Scientific classification
- Kingdom: Plantae
- Clade: Tracheophytes
- Clade: Angiosperms
- Clade: Eudicots
- Order: Caryophyllales
- Family: Aizoaceae
- Genus: Lithops
- Species: L. hermetica

Binomial name
- Lithops hermetica D.T.Cole

= Lithops hermetica =

Species of succulent

Lithops hermetica is a species of plant in the family Aizoaceae. It is endemic to Namibia. Its natural habitat is rocky areas. It was assessed by Lyndley Craven.
