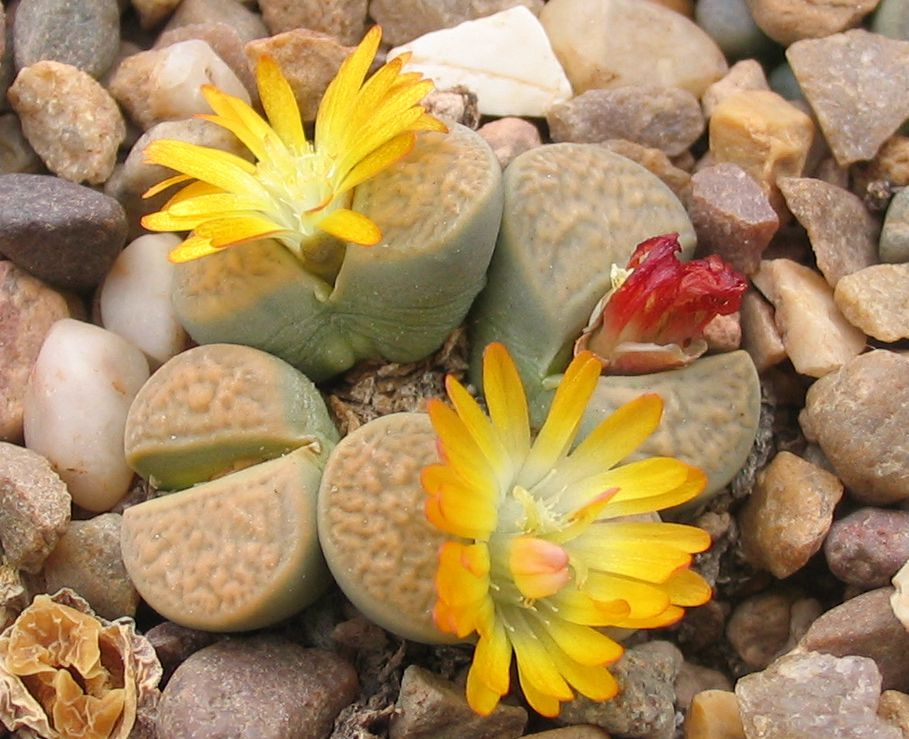

Scientific classification
- Kingdom: Plantae
- Clade: Tracheophytes
- Clade: Angiosperms
- Clade: Eudicots
- Order: Caryophyllales
- Family: Aizoaceae
- Genus: Lithops
- Species: L. divergens

Binomial name
- Lithops divergens L.Bolus

= Lithops divergens =

Species of succulent

Lithops divergens is a succulent plant species in the genus Lithops of the family Aizoaceae. It is endemic to the western Cape Provinces of South Africa. It is able to withstand intense climatic changes due to its resilience as a succulent. The average annual rainfall for its natural environment is less than 150 mm, occurring primarily in winter which is unusual for a Lithops.

== Description ==
L. divergens receives its name from its relatively unusual leaf growth. The plant's leaves grow in pairs sometimes clumped together, however the leaves separate in the center and are widely divergent from one another, forming a large fissure between the leaves. This is unlike the majority of its genus, for the leaves tend to grow next to one another without too much separation of most species. The leaves can be colors such as light and dark gray sometimes with tinges of green. The flowers are yellow and can grow to be larger than the leaves themselves. A capsule will form from the center of the flower if it is pollinated.

== Subspecies and cultivars ==
Two subspecies are accepted:

- Lithops divergens subsp. amethystina (de Boer) R.A.Earle & A.J.Young
- Lithops divergens subsp. divergens

There are two named cultivars of Lithops divergens: 'Pearl Blush' and 'Sunny Grassland ZW'. 'Pearl Blush' is unusual in having white flowers with pink tips instead of the normal yellow. 'Sunny Grassland ZW' is a green-bodied form of var. amethystina, also described as a pattern cultivar with "pale facial stippling".
