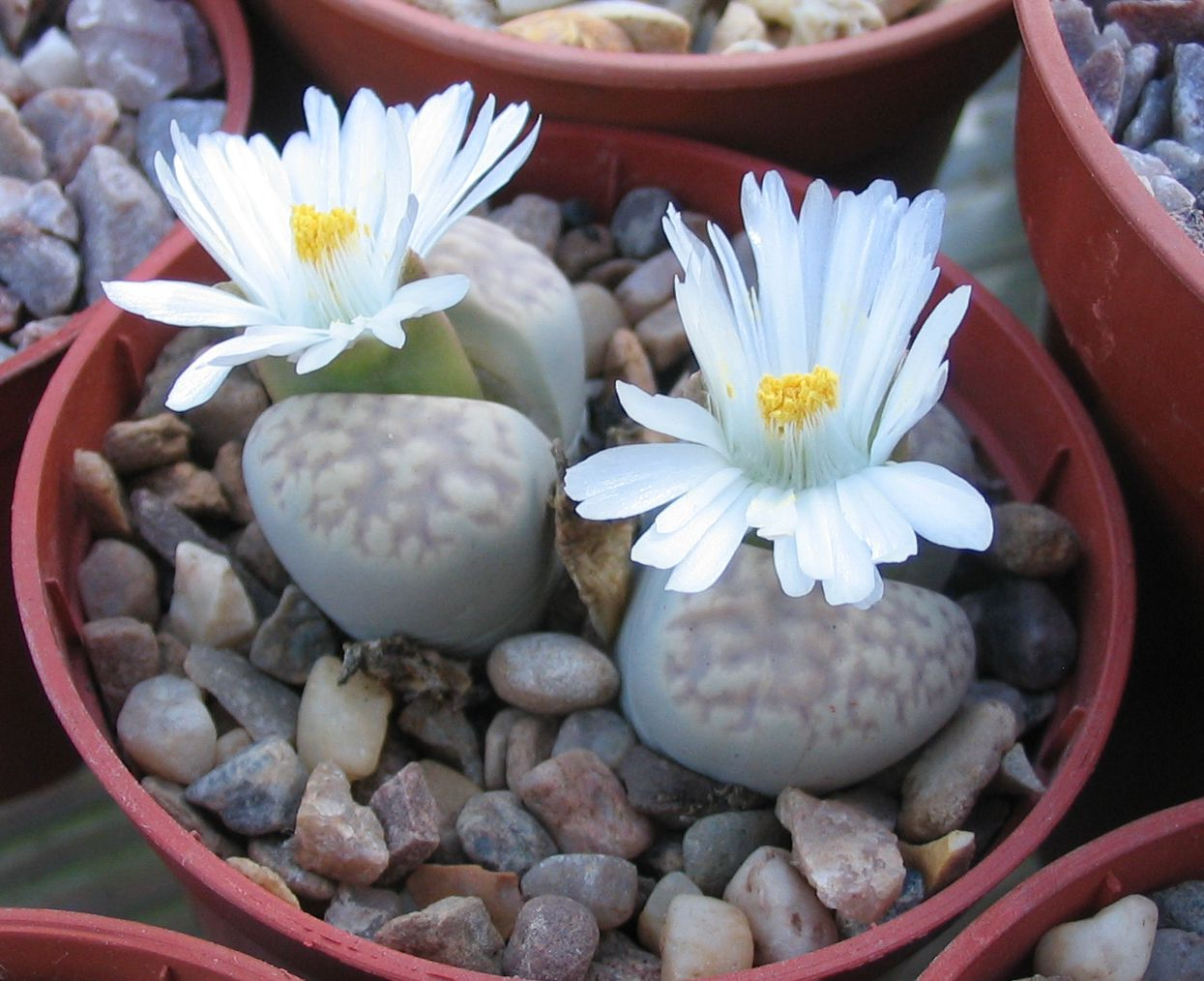
- Lithops amicorum in cultivation

Scientific classification
- Kingdom: Plantae
- Clade: Tracheophytes
- Clade: Angiosperms
- Clade: Eudicots
- Order: Caryophyllales
- Family: Aizoaceae
- Genus: Lithops
- Species: L. amicorum

Trinomial name
- Lithops amicorum subsp. D.T. Cole, 2006

= Lithops amicorum =

Subspecies of succulent

Lithops amicorum is a small succulent plant with white flowers, one of the smallest in the genus. It was named for the group of four friends who discovered it. It was collected by Desmond T. and Naureen A. Cole on 3 May 2004. After recent molecular analysis it was recombined to be a subspecies of Lithops karasmontana rather than its own species.

== Description ==
Lithops amicorum is a candidate for the smallest Lithops, typically 10–15 millimeters in diameter. Its leaves are whitish-grey, the translucent windows on the top faces marked with grey islands. Some plants have subtle dots or lines, sometimes reddish markings. The fleshy succulent leaves occur in pairs, with one new pair growing each year and the older pair drying up. L. amicorum typically forms clumps with 2–4 leaf pairs.

The flowers of L. amicorum are white and fairly small. The capsules are also small and nearly always have five locules.

Known only from three colonies near Aus, L. amicorum is a Namibian endemic.

== Cultivar ==
Lithops amicorum has one named cultivar, 'Freckled Friend'. 'Freckled Friend' is a pattern-cultivar which has darker and more prominent markings than typical for the species.
