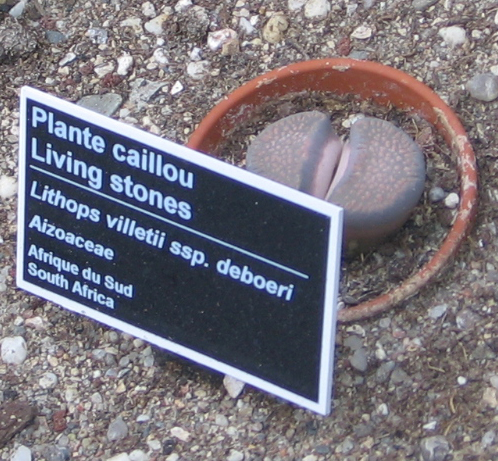

Scientific classification
- Kingdom: Plantae
- Clade: Tracheophytes
- Clade: Angiosperms
- Clade: Eudicots
- Order: Caryophyllales
- Family: Aizoaceae
- Genus: Lithops
- Species: L. villetii

Binomial name
- Lithops villetii L.Bolus

Synonyms
- Lithops deboeri Schwantes

= Lithops villetii =

Species of succulent

Lithops villetii is a species of the genus Lithops under the family Aizoaceae. The succulent plant is named after C. T. Villet. It is native to the Calvinia District, Namaqualand, Northern Cape, South Africa.

== Description ==
The leaves of L. villetii are extremely thick and light grey with tinges of green, yellow, or brown. They sometimes form in clumps, with the leaves paired in twos. The leaves also have spots of color, varying from plant to plant. Flowers are varying tinges of white, and are daisy-like.

There are two named subspecies, ssp. deboeri and ssp. kennedyi.
