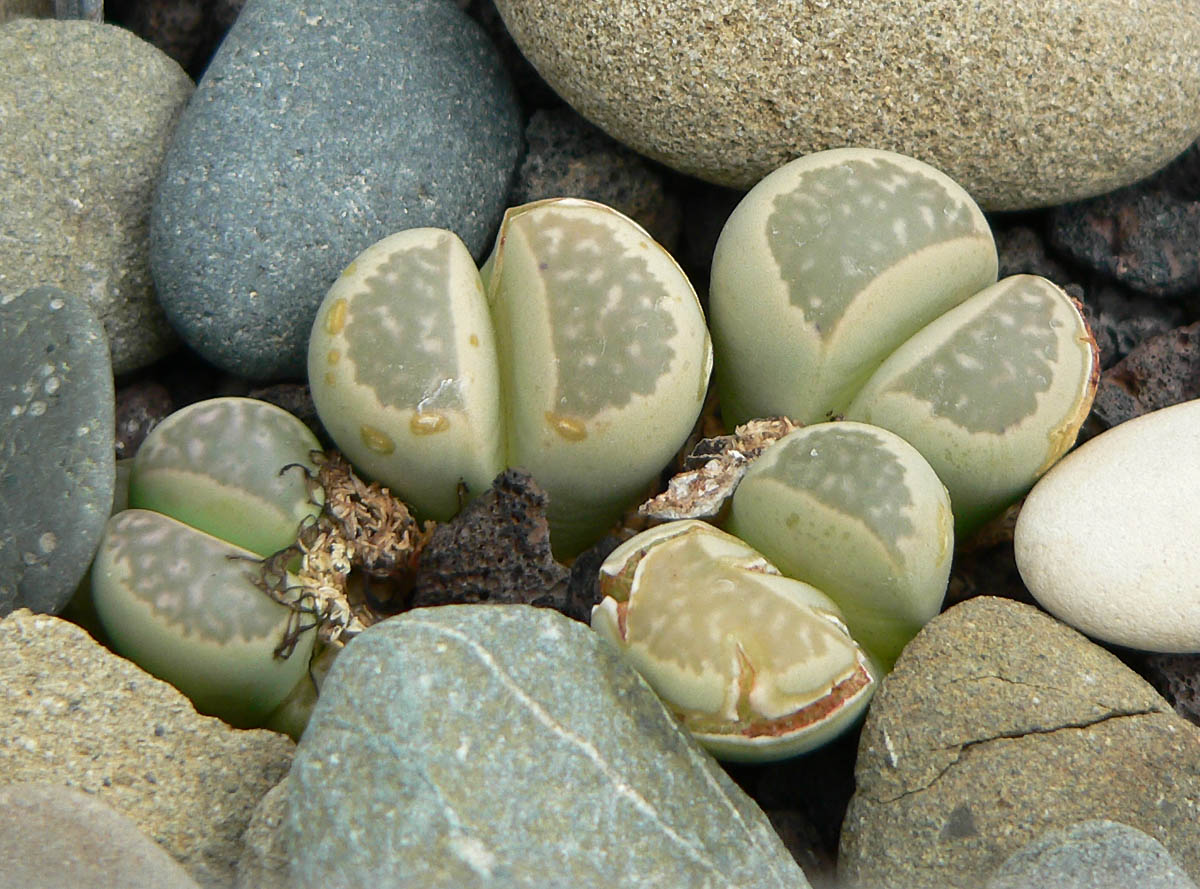

Scientific classification
- Kingdom: Plantae
- Clade: Tracheophytes
- Clade: Angiosperms
- Clade: Eudicots
- Order: Caryophyllales
- Family: Aizoaceae
- Genus: Lithops
- Species: L. herrei

Binomial name
- Lithops herrei L.Bolus

Synonyms
- Lithops geyeri Nel; Lithops hillii L.Bolus; Lithops translucens L.Bolus

= Lithops herrei =

Species of succulent

Lithops herrei is a species of succulent plant under the genus Lithops and family Aizoaceae. It derives its name from Adolar Herre, a German botanist of the 20th century.

== Description ==
The leaves grow in pairs of two and are ivory-white. They have a grey-green pattern on the top of the leaves. Flowers are dark yellow, and emerge from the fissure between the two leaves.
