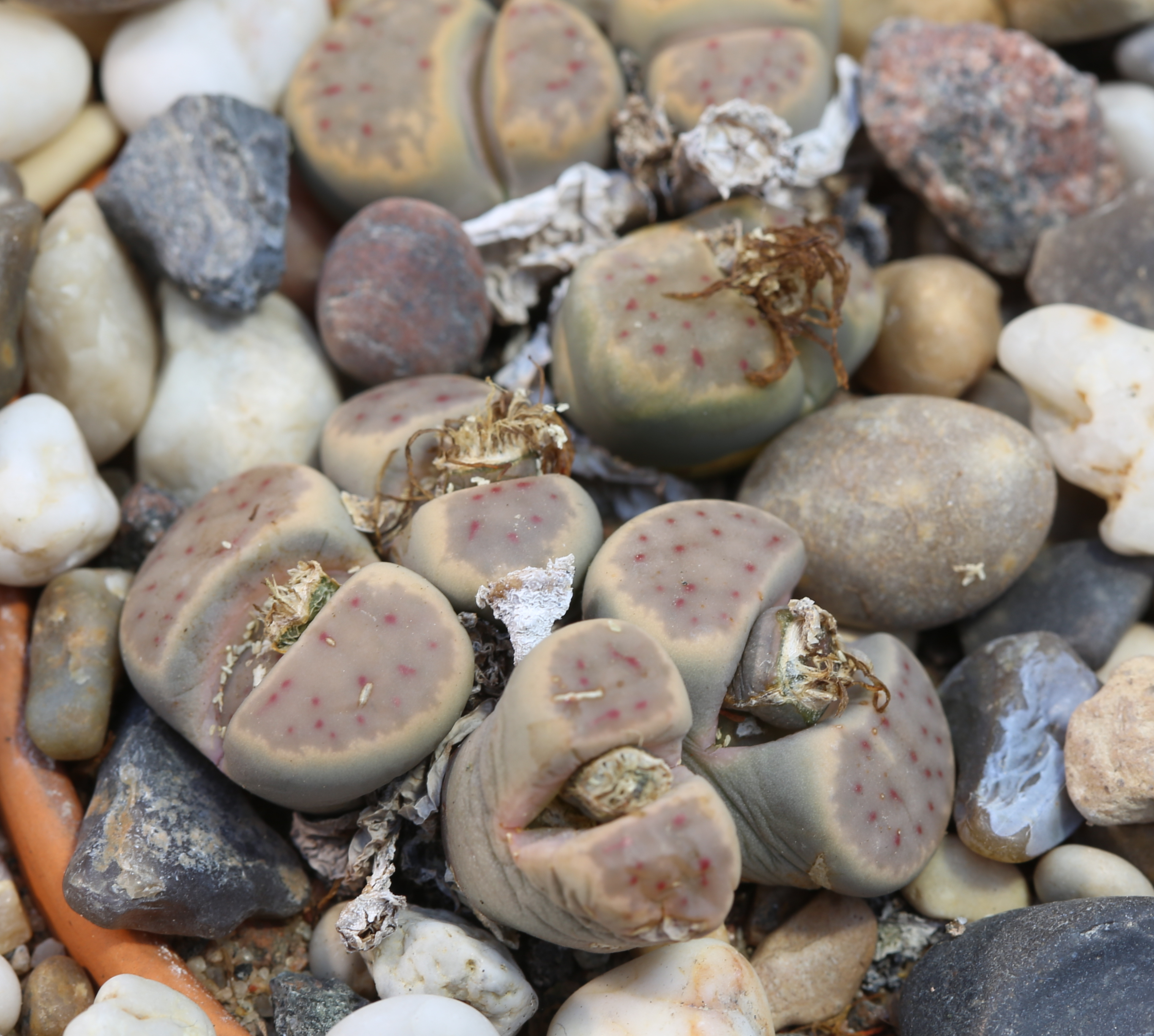

Scientific classification
- Kingdom: Plantae
- Clade: Tracheophytes
- Clade: Angiosperms
- Clade: Eudicots
- Order: Caryophyllales
- Family: Aizoaceae
- Genus: Lithops
- Species: L. dinteri

Binomial name
- Lithops dinteri Schwantes

Synonyms
- Lithops brevis L.Bolus; Lithops dinteri var. brevis (L.Bolus) B.Fearn; Lithops dinteri var. fredericii D.T.Cole; Lithops dinteri subsp. fredericii (D.T.Cole) D.T.Cole; Lithops dinteri var. multipunctata de Boer; Lithops dinteri subsp. multipunctata (de Boer) D.T.Cole; Lithops dorotheae Nel; Lithops eksteeniae L.Bolus; Lithops marthae Loesch & Tischer ex H.Jacobsen; Lithops schwantesii var. marthae (Loesch & Tischer ex H.Jacobsen) D.T.Cole

= Lithops dinteri =

Species of succulent

Lithops dinteri is a species of the genus Lithops of the family Aizoaceae. It is a succulent plant native to Namibia and the Northern Cape Province of South Africa, where it grows in deserts which receive an average yearly rainfall of 464 mm.

The succulent plant is named after Mortiz Kurt Dinter, a German botanist of the late 19th and early 20th century. He was a collector of exotic succulents and his collection numbered around 8,400 pressed specimens.

== Description ==
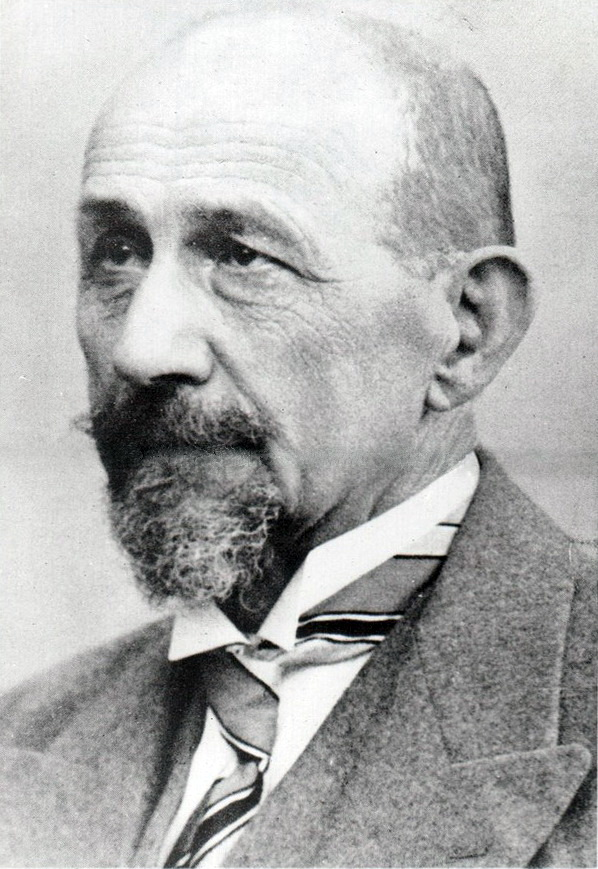
Mortiz Kurt Dinter

Lithops dinteri has leaves growing in pairs, and those pairs forming clumps of leaves. The leaves are thick, and hardly possess any stem. They have a small gap between them, out of which a yellow flower can blossom. The color of the sand or soil they grow in can determine the color of their lobes. Colors can range from red, to brown, to grey, and to cream. The leaves can also present red dots of the top, varying in number and size from plant to plant. The sides of the leaves are usually a purplish-green.
