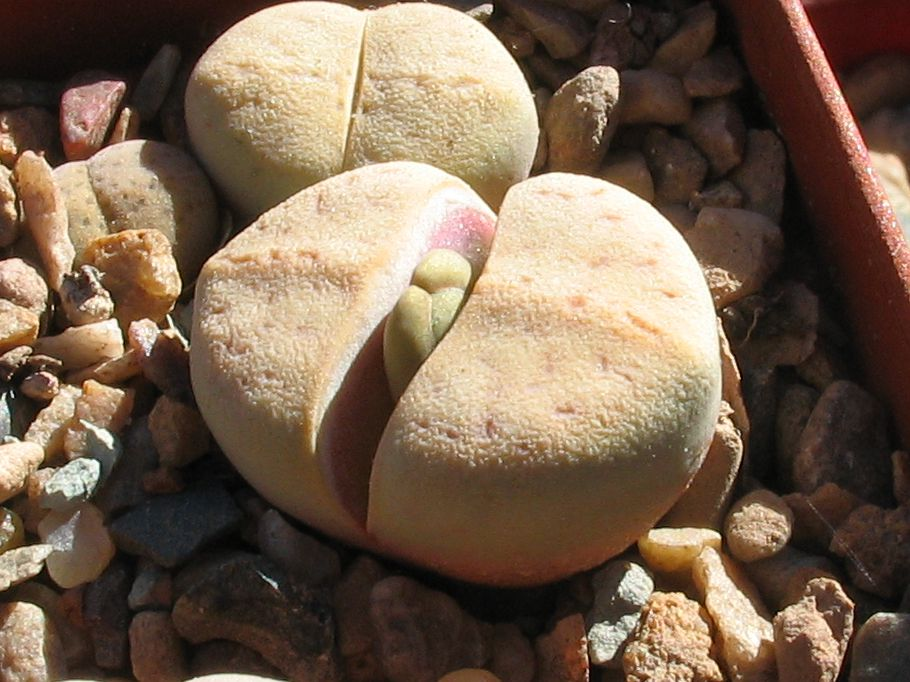
- Lithops vallis-mariae in cultivation

Conservation status
- Least Concern (IUCN 3.1)

Scientific classification
- Kingdom: Plantae
- Clade: Tracheophytes
- Clade: Angiosperms
- Clade: Eudicots
- Order: Caryophyllales
- Family: Aizoaceae
- Genus: Lithops
- Species: L. vallis-mariae

Binomial name
- Lithops vallis-mariae (Dinter & Schwantes) N.E.Br.

= Lithops vallis-mariae =

Species of succulent

Lithops vallis-mariae is a species of plant in the family Aizoaceae. It is endemic to Namibia. Its natural habitat is subtropical or tropical dry shrubland. It is threatened by habitat loss.
