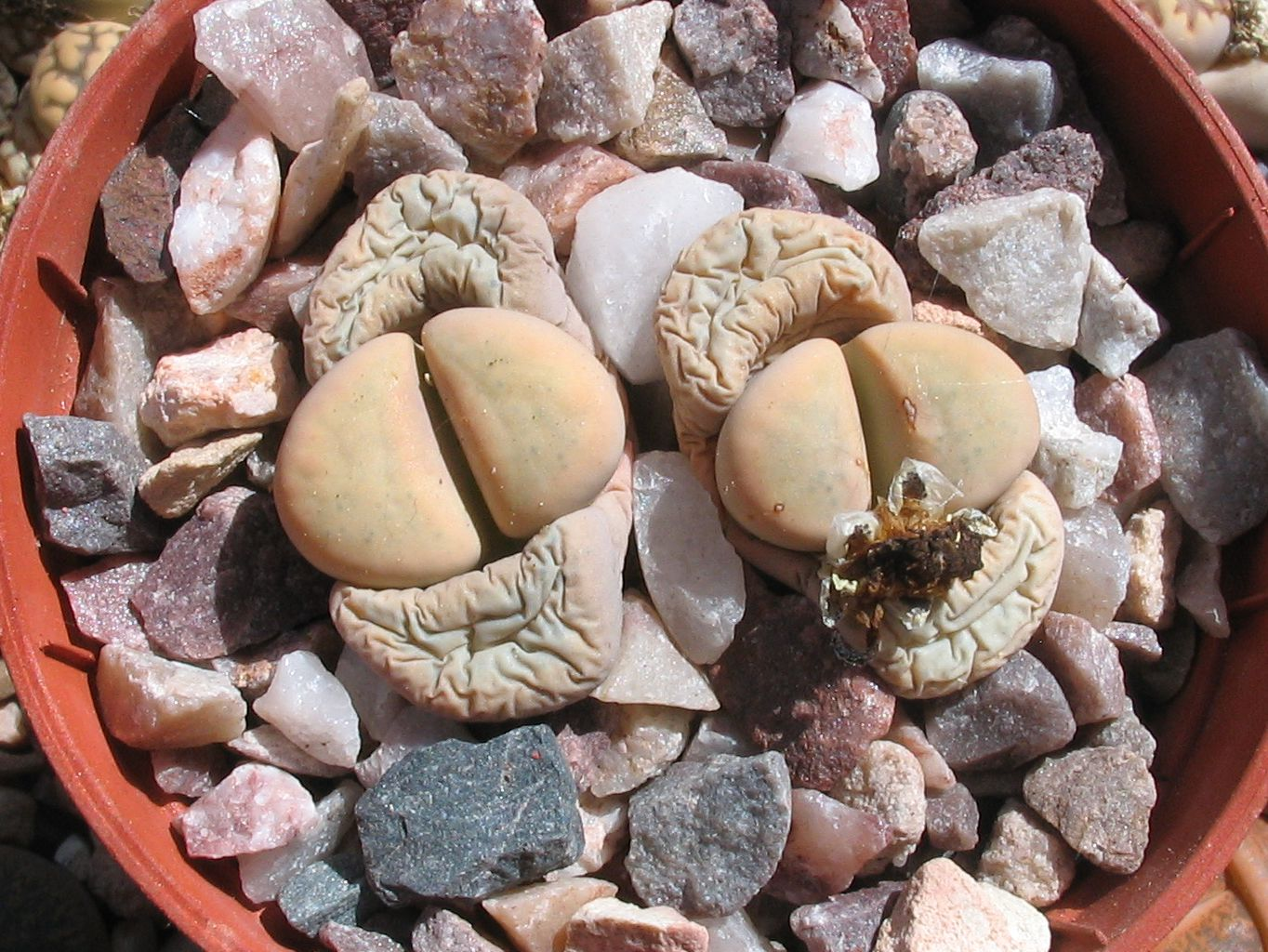

Scientific classification
- Kingdom: Plantae
- Clade: Tracheophytes
- Clade: Angiosperms
- Clade: Eudicots
- Order: Caryophyllales
- Family: Aizoaceae
- Genus: Lithops
- Species: L. meyeri

Binomial name
- Lithops meyeri L.Bolus

= Lithops meyeri =

Species of succulent

Lithops meyeri is a species of living stone (Lithops), under the family Aizoaceae. It is native to the Northern Cape province of South Africa. It is named after Rev. Gottlieb Meyer.

== Description ==
The succulent plant grows with its leaves in pairs of two, with hardly any stem, and very low to the ground. The leaves can be a variety of colors, including yellow, green, grey, black, orange, purple and others.
