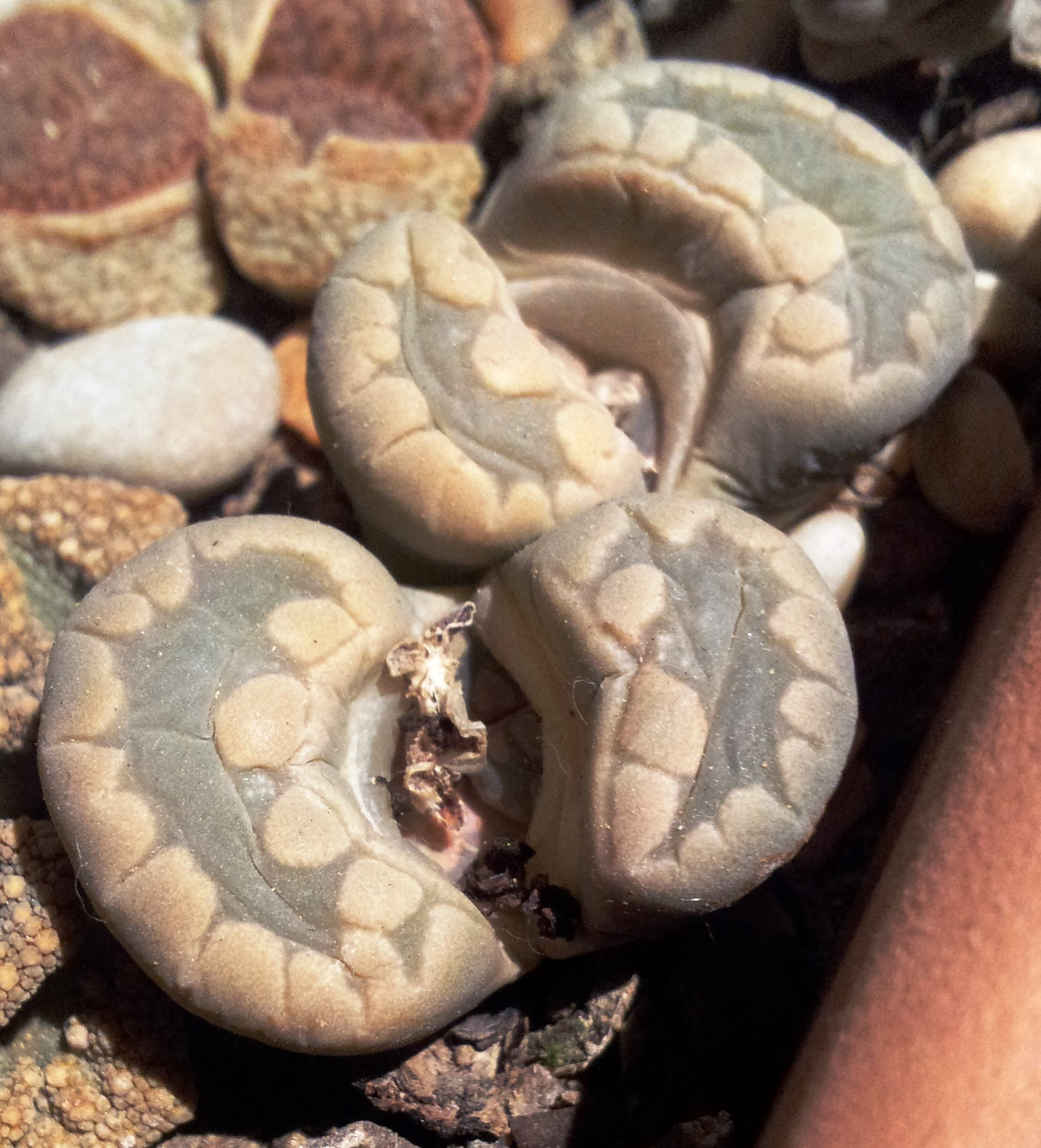

Scientific classification
- Kingdom: Plantae
- Clade: Tracheophytes
- Clade: Angiosperms
- Clade: Eudicots
- Order: Caryophyllales
- Family: Aizoaceae
- Genus: Lithops
- Species: L. otzeniana

Binomial name
- Lithops otzeniana Nel

= Lithops otzeniana =

Species of succulent

Lithops otzeniana is a species of succulent plant under the genus Lithops. It belongs to the family Aizoaceae. L. otzeniana is native to the Northern Cape province of South Africa. It derives its name from M. Otzen, who invited its discoverer, G.C. Nel, on the trip in which he discovered it.

== Description ==
The succulent plant L. otzeniana forms usually in small groups of 2–5 heads, with each head consisting of a pair of thick leaves. The leaves are olive-green to grey, and have a saw-tooth-edged patch of darker color in the center of each leaf. Flowers are yellow with a white center; they sprout from the center of the two leaves on each head.
