= Gert Cornelius Nel =

South African botanist (1885–1950)

Gert Cornelius Nel (6 April 1885 – 16 February 1950) was a South African botanist. His formal botanical author abbreviation is Nel.

The genus Nelia, a flowering plant of the family Aizoaceae, is named in his honor.

== Biography ==
Nel was born in 1885 in Greytown, Natal Colony on a farm. He earned a BA at the University of Stellenbosch then earned a doctorate in botany at the University of Berlin under both Adolf Engler and Gottlieb Haberlandt. Nel emphasized African plant species in his studies, especially in the families Amaryllidaceae and Hypoxidaceae. He provided numerous first descriptions of species of the genera Forbesia, Ianthe, Hypoxis, and Rhodohypoxis.

In 1921, Nel became a professor of botany at the University of Stellenbosch, a position he would hold until his death.

Nel published the first book on the plant genus Lithops in the family Aizoaceae in 1946, entitled Lithops. Lithops are native to southern Africa and known for their stone-like appearance.

Nel died in Stellenbosch in 1950.

== Legacy ==
The genus Nelia, discovered in 1928 by Gustav Schwantes, is named after Nel. Other succulent plant species are also named after Nel, including:

- Braunsia nelii
- Conophytum nelianum
- Euphorbia nelii
- Gasteria neliana
- Gibbaeum nelii
- Glottiphyllum nelii
- Hereroa nelii
- Herrea nelii
- Stapelia neliana
