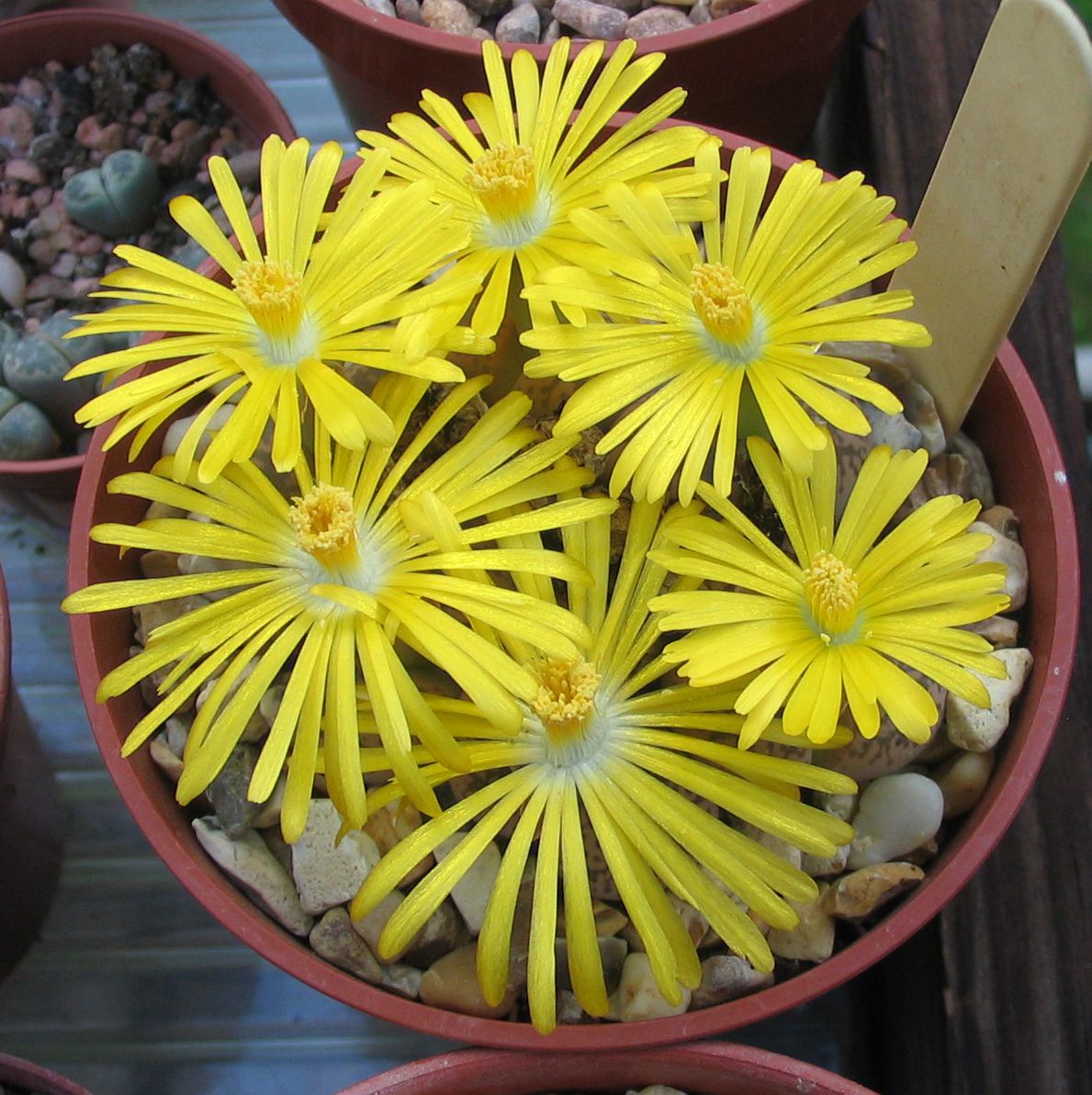
- Lithops gesinae in flower

Scientific classification
- Kingdom: Plantae
- Clade: Tracheophytes
- Clade: Angiosperms
- Clade: Eudicots
- Order: Caryophyllales
- Family: Aizoaceae
- Genus: Lithops
- Species: L. gesineae

Binomial name
- Lithops gesineae de Boer

= Lithops gesineae =

Species of succulent

Lithops gesineae is a species of the genus Lithops under the family Aizoaceae. It is native to Namibia.

== Description ==
Lithops gesineae is a succulent plant with leaves that grow in pairs. The leaves are gray or brown with tinges of green, and have spots of brown or darker color on the top. Flowers are yellow.
