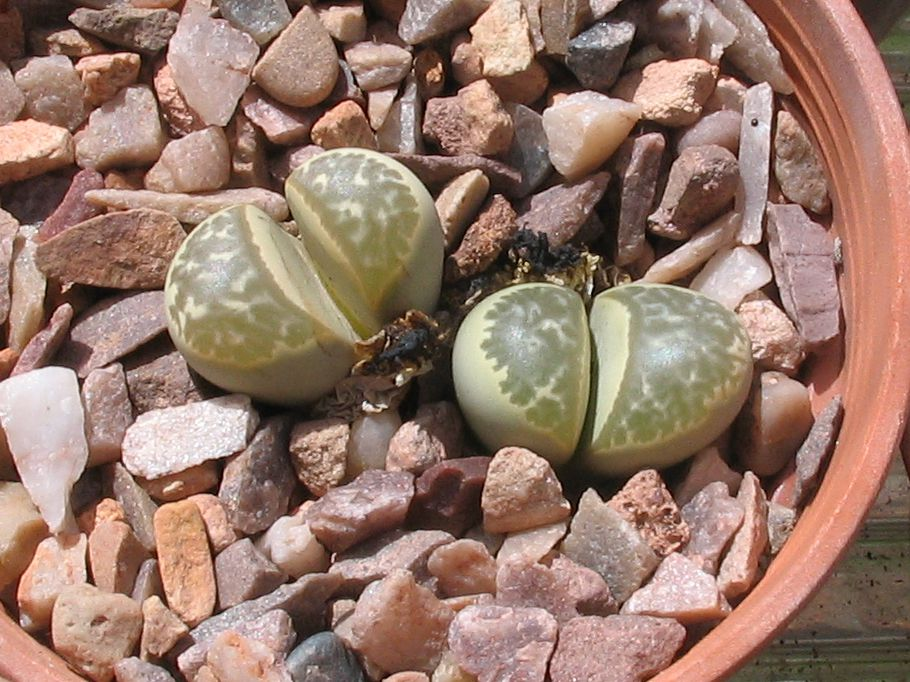

Scientific classification
- Kingdom: Plantae
- Clade: Tracheophytes
- Clade: Angiosperms
- Clade: Eudicots
- Order: Caryophyllales
- Family: Aizoaceae
- Genus: Lithops
- Species: L. helmutii

Binomial name
- Lithops helmutii L.Bolus

= Lithops helmutii =

Species of succulent

Lithops helmutii is a species of pebble plant. It is native to the northwestern Cape Provinces of South Africa.

== Description ==
The leaves, which grow in pairs of two, are green and marked with grey patterns. The flowers are golden yellow with a white center.
