= Nelia (plant) =

Scientific classification
- Kingdom: Plantae
- Clade: Tracheophytes
- Clade: Angiosperms
- Clade: Eudicots
- Order: Caryophyllales
- Family: Aizoaceae
- Tribe: Ruschieae
- Genus: Nelia; Schwantes (1928)

Species
- Nelia pillansii (N.E.Br.) Schwantes; Nelia schlechteri Schwantes

Synonyms
- Sterropetalum N.E.Br. (1928)

Genus of flowering plants

Nelia is a genus of flowering plants in the family Aizoaceae. It includes two species of succulent subshrubs endemic to the Cape Provinces of South Africa.

- Nelia pillansii (N.E.Br.) Schwantes
- Nelia schlechteri Schwantes
