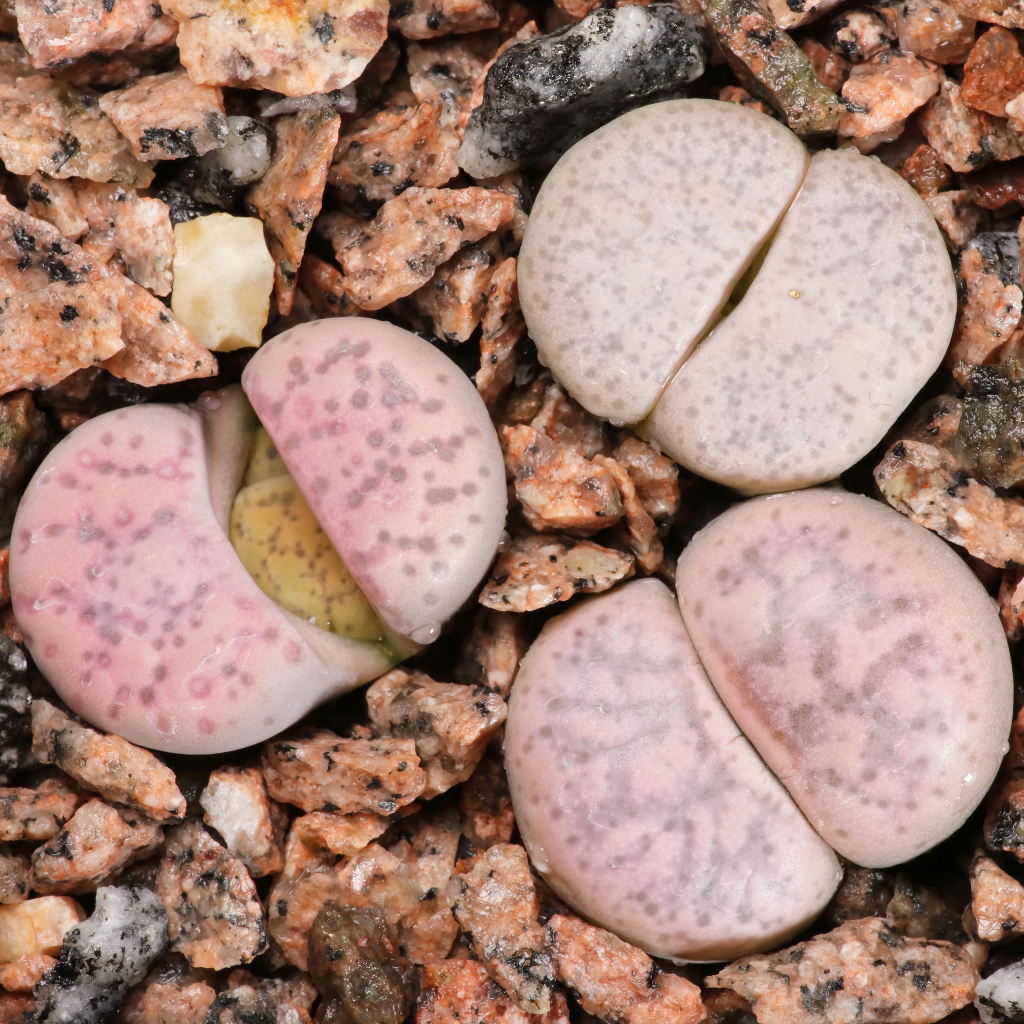

Conservation status
- Vulnerable (IUCN 3.1)

Scientific classification
- Kingdom: Plantae
- Clade: Tracheophytes
- Clade: Angiosperms
- Clade: Eudicots
- Order: Caryophyllales
- Family: Aizoaceae
- Genus: Lithops
- Species: L. francisci

Binomial name
- Lithops francisci (Dinter & Schwantes) N.E.Br.

= Lithops francisci =

Species of succulent

Lithops francisci, commonly known as one of the living stones or pebble plants, is in the family Aizoaceae. It is endemic to the arid desert environments of Namibia. It is a succulent with a natural habitat in rocky areas. L. francisci was assessed by Nicholas Edward Brown in 1925. It is one of the Lithops plants and shares the characteristic bi-leaf head pattern separated by a deep fissure, the bottom of which houses and protects the stunted stem.

== Discovery and etymology ==
L. francisci was first sampled by Kurt Dinter in July 1922 during a research expedition to southern Africa. In 1926, he published his description of the species, naming it after a friend, the Dutch horticulturist Frantz de Laet of Contich.

== Habitat and ecology ==
L. francisci is a desert perennial. It thrives in climates that are dry and have moderately low annual temperatures. It requires coarse, well-drained sandy soils and is therefore usually found on rocky hillsides. Its habitat tends to have a lot of metamorphic rock such as schist and gneiss, which also matches the natural coloration of the plant. This adaptation acts as a camouflage, preventing easy predation of the plant's succulent, nutrient rich tissue. The annual rainfall in the population range of L. francisci varies from 0 to 99 millimetres (0.0 to 3.9 in) per year, and temperatures fluctuate in the range 9–20 °C (48–68 °F).

== Distribution ==
L. francisci is native to Namibia in southern Africa, more specifically, the coastal desert of Namib. It can be found in the southern hills of both Kovisberg and Halenberg. This location was affirmed by horticulturist Werner Tribner, who also studied Lithops and had a species named after him, L. werneri. After its initial discovery in the southern hills, it was also spotted further northeast, in the Konipberg mountains, roughly 65 kilometres (40 mi) north of Lüderitz.

Due to the popularity of this species, as well as many of the other Lithops in the succulent plant trade, it can be found in markets across the world. L. francisci was once sold and harvested to the point of threatening the endemic population. Over the past 100 years, thousands of these plants have been dug up and exported from their native habitat. This practice has significantly decreased the effective population size within the small (< 625 square kilometres or 241 square miles) range of natural occurrence. However, the IUCN reports a decrease in this activity over the last 15 years and though population size and range is still decreasing, the pace has begun to slow.

== Morphology ==
L. francisci is a short succulent dicot with multiple heads (usually three to six, but ranging up to 20). Each head consists of two short thick modified leaves separated by a deep fissure. The face of both leaves are rugose with small channels usually of a different color than the bumps. There are also many dusky dots on the face of the leaf, which are irregularly spread across the entire upward-facing surface. Both the dusky dots and the channels usually appear as greyish-green and the elevated tissue tends to have a cream or beige coloring. Pink, green and yellow tinges have also been observed in the elevated tissue. It has a small and squat stature, with the diameter of the larger leaf averaging at about 24 mm (0.94 in), though they have been known to exceed 30 mm (1.2 in).

== Reproduction ==
These plants produce small yellow flowers during their reproductive season in the autumn. Each head only produces a single flower. The flower emerges as a bud which rises from the central fissure, separating the bifurcated leaves.

L. francisci is an obligate outcrosser and pollinated flowers produce a capsule. The capsules usually have five locules, occasionally six. The seeds are yellow to yellowish brown and have a rugose texture coating similar to that of the modified leaf.
