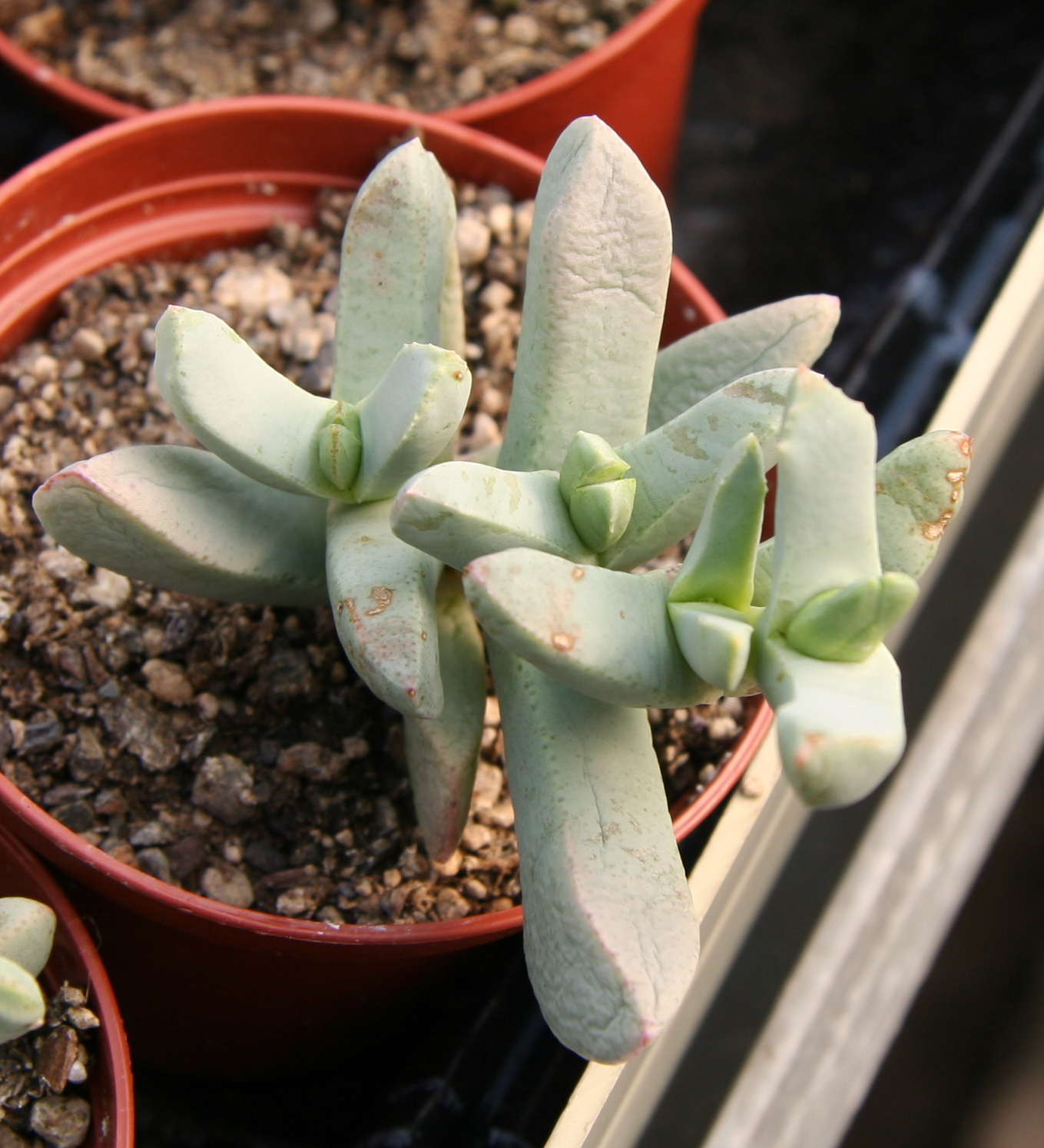

Conservation status
- Least Concern (IUCN 3.1)

Scientific classification
- Kingdom: Plantae
- Clade: Tracheophytes
- Clade: Angiosperms
- Clade: Eudicots
- Order: Caryophyllales
- Family: Aizoaceae
- Genus: Juttadinteria
- Species: J. deserticola

Binomial name
- Juttadinteria deserticola (Marloth) Schwantes

Synonyms
- Mesembryanthemum deserticola Marloth; Mesembryanthemum elizae Dinter & A.Berger; Mesembryanthemum insolitum L.Bolus; Juttadinteria elizae (Dinter & A.Berger) L.Bolus; Juttadinteria insolita (L.Bolus) L.Bolus; Juttadinteria buchubergensis Dinter; Juttadinteria tetrasepala L.Bolus; Juttadinteria decumbens Schick & Tischer

= Juttadinteria deserticola =

Species of succulent

Juttadinteria deserticola is a species of plant in the family Aizoaceae that is native to Namibia and South Africa.

== Distribution and habitat ==
J. deserticola is known from Lüderitz in the ǁKaras Region of Namibia and Namaqualand in South Africa, where it grows on sedimentary schists and on stony flats covered by gravel or sand.

== Description ==
J. deserticola is a decumbent to upright succulent plant. The leaves are boat-shaped to pointed, measuring up to 30 mm (1.2 in) long and 20 mm (0.79 in) wide. The flowers each measure 20–30 mm (0.79–1.18 in) across with 40-60 petals and 150-250 stamens.
