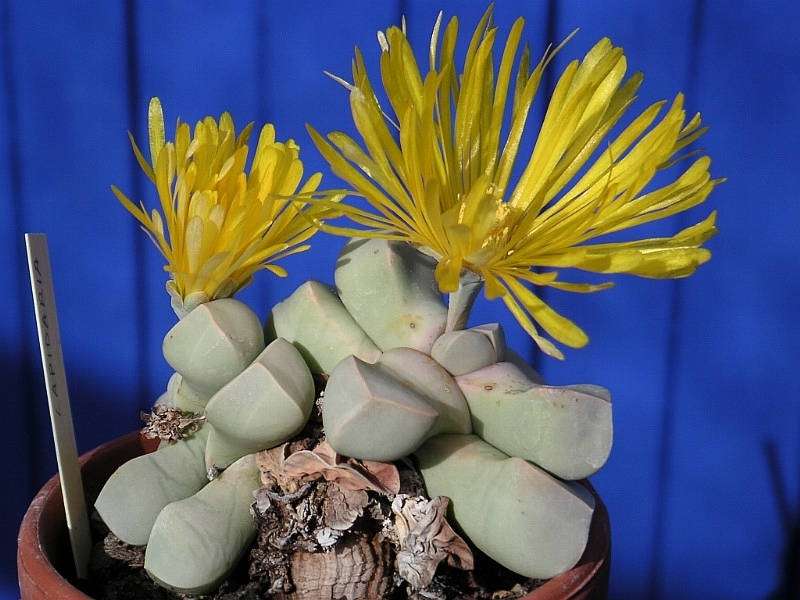
- Flowering Lapidaria margaretae

Scientific classification
- Kingdom: Plantae
- Clade: Tracheophytes
- Clade: Angiosperms
- Clade: Eudicots
- Order: Caryophyllales
- Family: Aizoaceae
- Subfamily: Ruschioideae
- Tribe: Ruschieae
- Genus: Lapidaria (Dinter & Schwantes) N.E. Br.
- Species: L. margaretae

Binomial name
- Lapidaria margaretae (Schwantes) Dinter & Schwantes

Synonyms
- Mesebrianthemum margaretae Schwantes; Argyroderma margaretae (Schwantes) N.E.Br.; Dinteranthus margaretae Schwantes; Argyroderma roeatum N.E.Br.

= Lapidaria margaretae =

Species of succulent

Lapidaria is a monotypic genus of dwarf succulent plants in the family Aizoaceae. The only species it contains is Lapidaria margaretae, also known as the Karoo rose.

== Description ==
Lapidaria margaretae resembles those genera within the family Aizoaceae to which it is most closely related; namely Lithops, Dinteranthus and Schwantesia. However, while Lithops and Dinteranthus will typically only have one pair of leaves, L. margaretae has two to four pairs of leaves. Each leaf is 1.5–2 cm long and 1 cm wide. Clumps of up to three heads may be formed with age.

The plant is mostly dormant during the hot summer and cold winter, only growing during the spring and autumn, with flowering occurring in the latter, or in early winter. It flowers with a single 5 cm wide yellow flower that can eclipse the plant. This flower contains 6 or 8 sepals, up to around 100 petals and 300–500 stamens. It opens during the day. The flowering might be solitary, or succeeded by up to two others.

== Distribution ==
This species is native to dry areas (250 mm per year) in southern Namibia, around Warmbad and the Northern Cape areas adjacent to Warmbad in South Africa, at an elevation of 660 to 1,100 metres (2,170 to 3,610 ft) above sea level.

== Habitat ==
Lapidaria margaretae grows on white quartz plains, in crevices, in red sand or on loose stone. It is usually located on Northeast-facing gentle hill slope in full sun, or under dwarf shrub in a succulent steppe. It often grows near other stone-like succulents, such as Lithops species.

== Cultivation ==
Even though there are no commercial uses for L. margaretae, it is sometimes cultivated as an ornamental plant. They need full bright sunlight throughout the year and will grow at any time when the weather is warm and sunny and water is available. Plants are frost tolerant to −4 °C (25 °F).

== Sources ==
- Southern African Wild Flowers: Jewels of the Veld page 160–161
- SIBIS: Lapidaria margaretea
