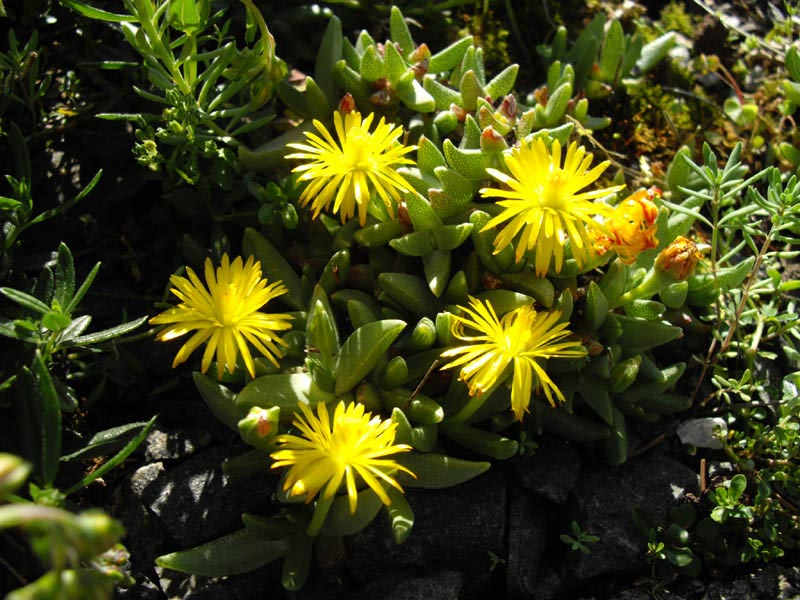
- Chasmatophyllum musculinum

Scientific classification
- Kingdom: Plantae
- Clade: Tracheophytes
- Clade: Angiosperms
- Clade: Eudicots
- Order: Caryophyllales
- Family: Aizoaceae
- Subfamily: Ruschioideae
- Tribe: Ruschieae
- Genus: Chasmatophyllum (Schwantes) Dinter & Schwantes

= Chasmatophyllum =

Genus of succulents

Chasmatophyllum is a genus of succulent plants native to South Africa (Cape Provinces, Free State, and Northern Provinces), Lesotho, and Namibia in southern Africa.

The genus contains seven accepted species:

- Chasmatophyllum braunsii Schwantes
- Chasmatophyllum maninum L.Bolus
- Chasmatophyllum musculinum (Haw.) Dinter & Schwantes
- Chasmatophyllum nelli Schwantes
- Chasmatophyllum rouxii L.Bolus
- Chasmatophyllum stanleyi (L.Bolus) H.E.K.Hartmann
- Chasmatophyllum willowmorense (L.Bolus) L.Bolus

The Red List of South African plants at the South African National Biodiversity Institute lists the conservation status of musculinum, nelli, stanleyi, and verdoorniae as being of least concern. The population of willowmorense is restricted in area, but stable, and there is insufficient information to assess the remaining three species.
