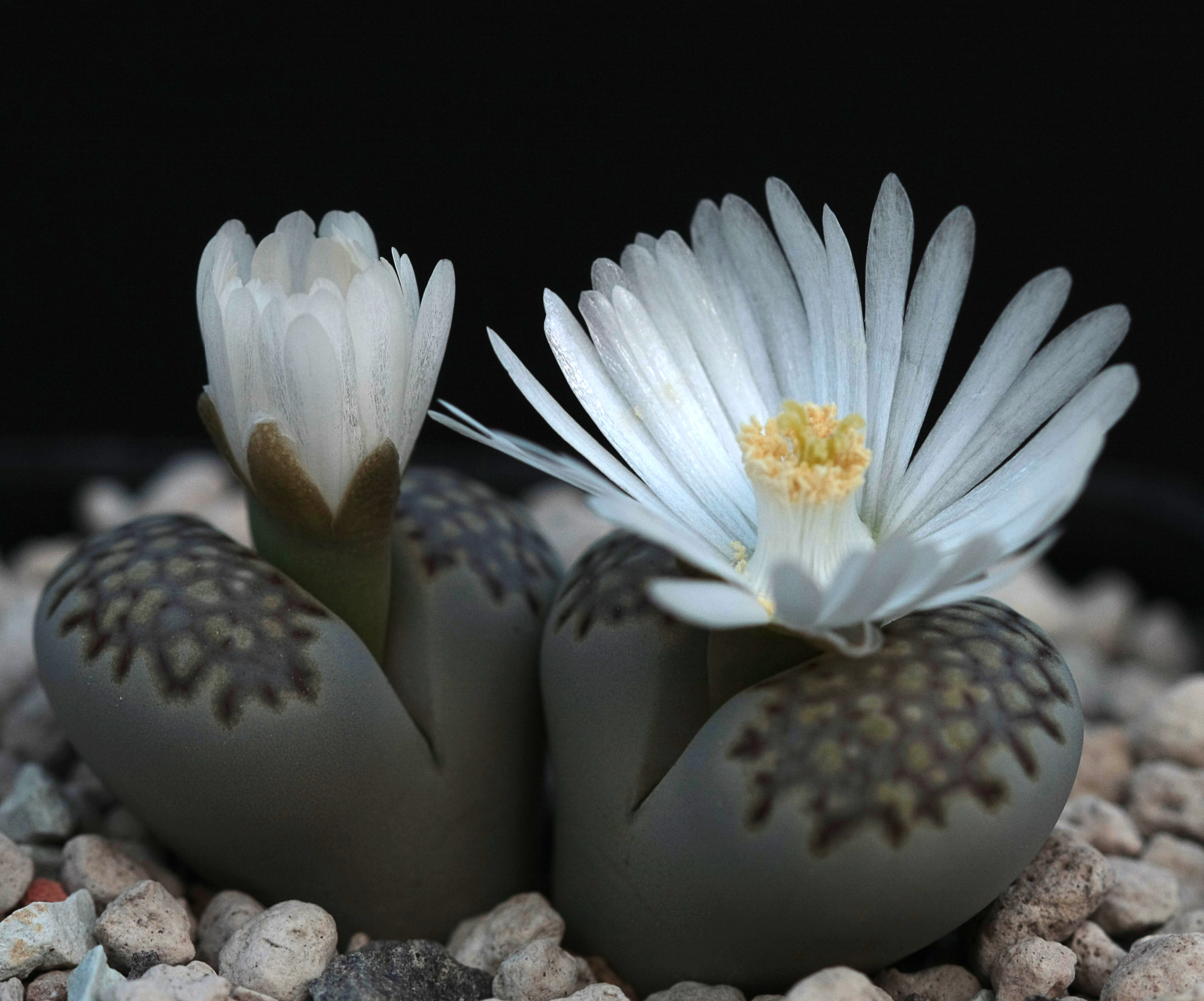

Scientific classification
- Kingdom: Plantae
- Clade: Embryophytes
- Clade: Tracheophytes
- Clade: Spermatophytes
- Clade: Angiosperms
- Clade: Eudicots
- Order: Caryophyllales
- Family: Aizoaceae
- Genus: Lithops
- Species: L. julii

Binomial name
- Lithops julii (Dinter & Schwantes) N.E.Br.

= Lithops julii =

Species of succulent

Lithops julii is a species of succulent plant of the genus Lithops under the family Aizoaceae. It is native to Southern Africa, and was first collected by Kurt Dinter, a German botanist, and named after his friend, Julius Derenberg.

== Description ==
Lithops julii is almost stemless, with a pair of leaves out of the center of which flowers and new leaves grow. Leaves are usually a pale grey, with a grid of linear depressions. The colors of the depression vary from plant to plant, but can be tinges of red, brown, green, blue, pink, or beige. Flowers sprout from between the two leaves and are white.
