= Juttadinteria ausensis =

Conservation status
- Least Concern (IUCN 3.1)

Scientific classification
- Kingdom: Plantae
- Clade: Tracheophytes
- Clade: Angiosperms
- Clade: Eudicots
- Order: Caryophyllales
- Family: Aizoaceae
- Genus: Juttadinteria
- Species: J. ausensis

Binomial name
- Juttadinteria ausensis (L.Bolus) Schwantes

Synonyms
- Mesembryanthemum ausense L.Bolus; Mesembryanthemum suavissimum Dinter; Juttadinteria suavissima (Dinter) Schwantes

Species of succulent

Juttadinteria ausensis is a species of plant in the family Aizoaceae that is endemic to Namibia.

== Distribution and habitat ==
J. ausensis is known only from 5-10 subpopulations near Lüderitz in the ǁKaras Region of Namibia, where it grows in open, sandy plains among dolomite, quartz, and limestone pebbles.

== Description ==
J. ausensis is an upright or decumbent succulent plant growing to 300 mm (12 in) tall. The leaves are three-sided, grey-green in colour, measuring 20–43 mm (0.79–1.69 in) by 10–15 mm (0.39–0.59 in) with toothed margins. The flowers, measuring 40–45 mm (1.6–1.8 in) across, each bear 45-65 white petals and over 250 stamens.
