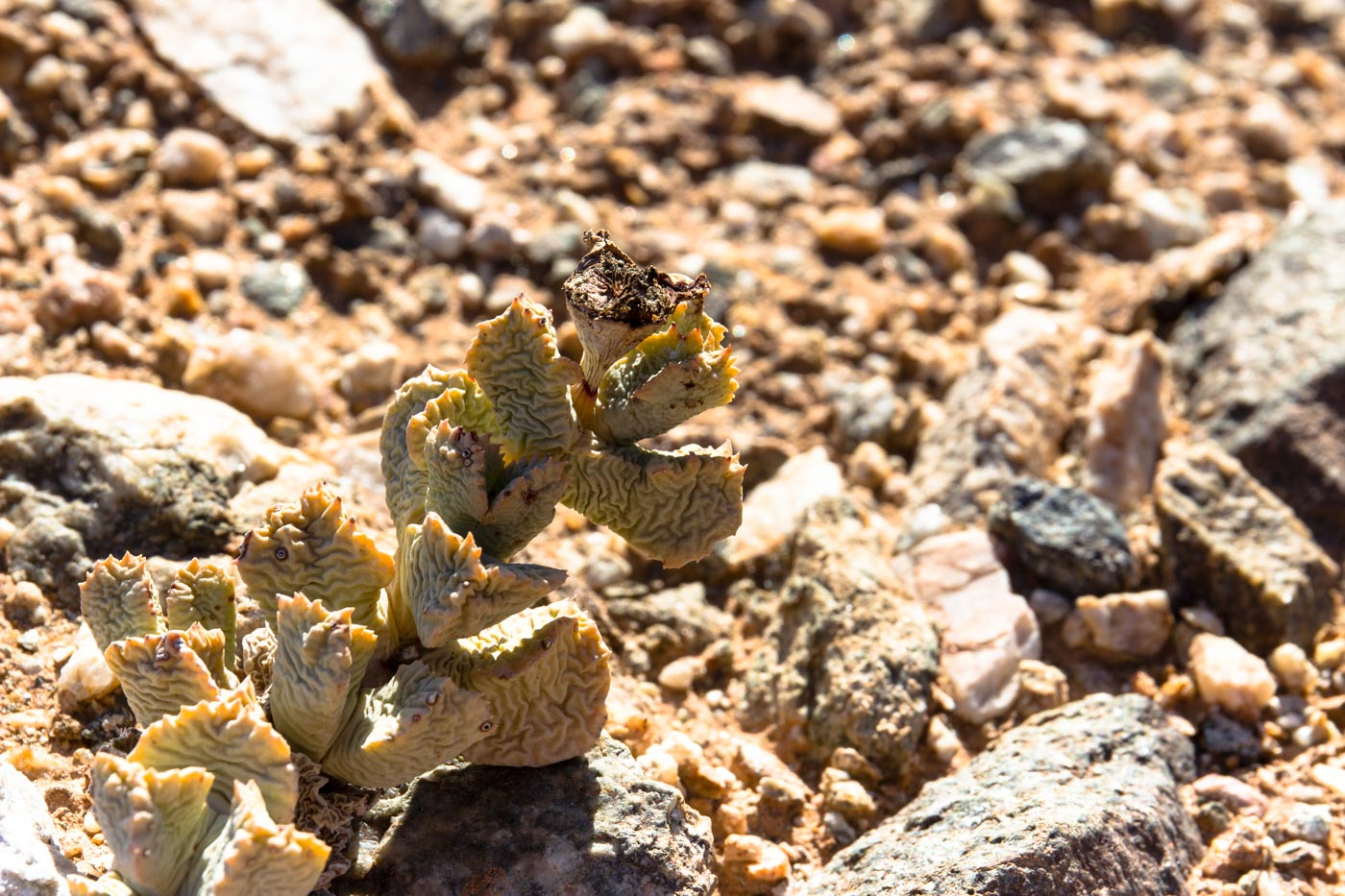
- Juttadinteria simpsonii at Halenberg Station

Conservation status
- Critically Endangered (IUCN 3.1)

Scientific classification
- Kingdom: Plantae
- Clade: Tracheophytes
- Clade: Angiosperms
- Clade: Eudicots
- Order: Caryophyllales
- Family: Aizoaceae
- Genus: Juttadinteria
- Species: J. simpsonii

Binomial name
- Juttadinteria simpsonii (Dinter) Schwantes

Synonyms
- Mesembryanthemum simpsonii Dinter; Juttadinteria kovisimontana (Dinter) Schwantes; Mesembryanthemum kovisimontanum Dinter

= Juttadinteria simpsonii =

Species of succulent

Juttadinteria simpsonii is a species of succulent plant in the family Aizoaceae. It is a critically endangered species endemic to Namibia.

== Distribution and habitat ==
Juttadinteria simpsonii is known only from four subpopulations near Lüderitz in the ǁKaras Region of Namibia, 390–606 m (1,280–1,988 ft) above sea level, where it grows on granitic-gneiss ridges, sandy pockets amongst dolomite rocks, low and mid-elevation mountain slopes, and rocky or sandy plains. 90% of the population occurs within the Namib-Naukluft National Park, with the other 10% found in the Tsau ǁKhaeb Sperrgebiet National Park.

== Description ==
Juttadinteria simpsonii is an upright shrub growing to 250 mm (9.8 in) tall with up to 15 branches. The leaves are boat-shaped, with teeth along the margins, keels, and sometimes faces. The flowers, measuring 20–35 mm (0.79–1.38 in) across, each bear 40-60 white petals and 180–305 stamens.

== Conservation status ==
Juttadinteria simpsonii is listed as critically endangered by the International Union for the Conservation of Nature under criteria A3d and A4ad, based on the decline of its population due to exploitation. Though the entire population falls within the boundaries of protected areas, it is frequently poached for the ornamental plant trade. A 2024 assessment for the IUCN Red List estimated that the population has declined by 60% since 2006, with a future decline of 80% expected by 2044.
