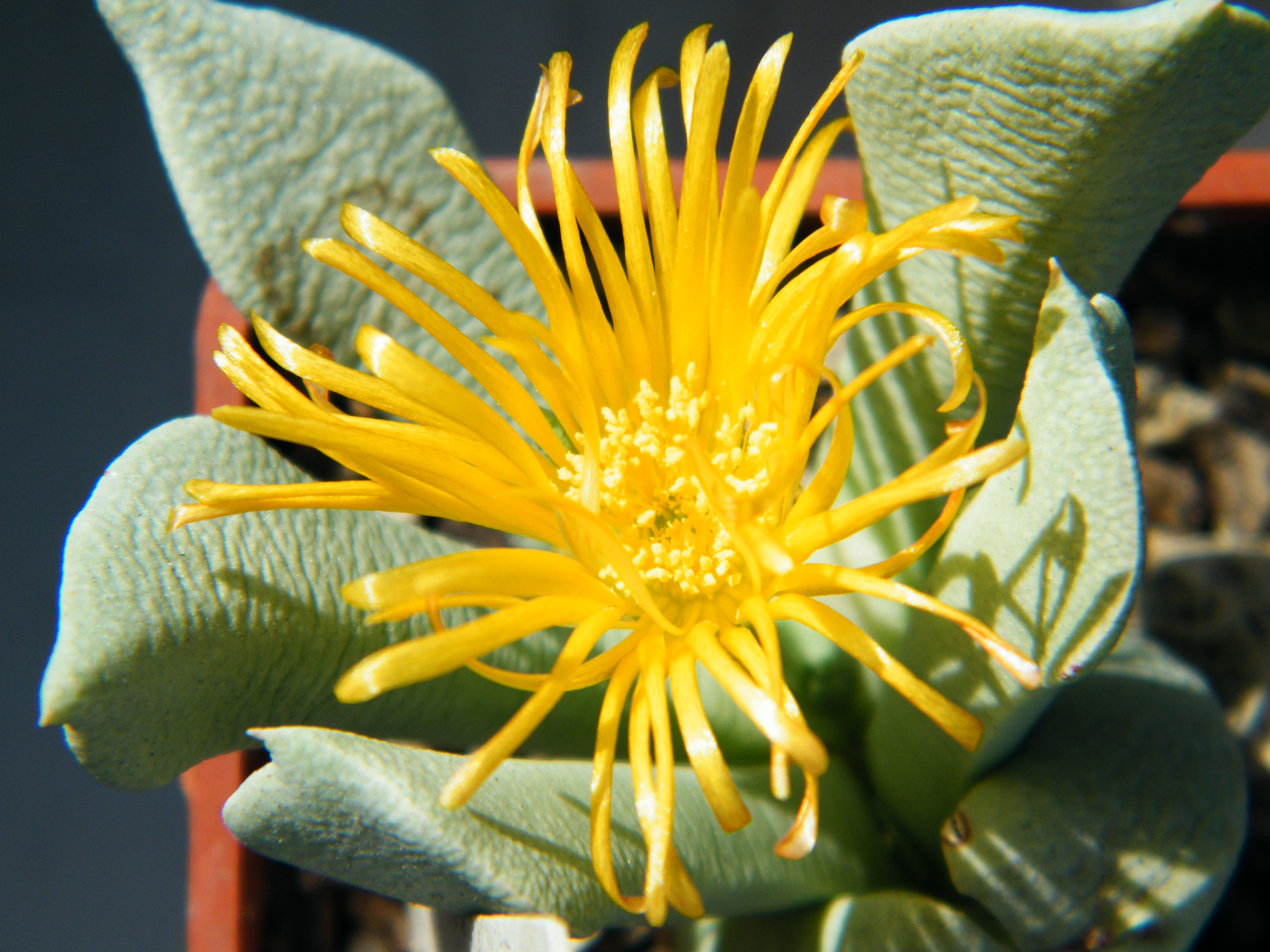
- Schwantesia borcherdsii

Scientific classification
- Kingdom: Plantae
- Clade: Tracheophytes
- Clade: Angiosperms
- Clade: Eudicots
- Order: Caryophyllales
- Family: Aizoaceae
- Subfamily: Ruschioideae
- Tribe: Ruschieae
- Genus: Schwantesia; Dinter

= Schwantesia =

Genus of succulents

Schwantesia is a genus of plant in the family Aizoaceae. It is native to Namibia and the Cape Provinces of South Africa. It is named in honor of the German botanist and archaeologist Gustav Schwantes (1881–1960).

Schwantesia species resemble those genera within the family Aizoaceae to which they are most closely related; namely Lithops, Dinteranthus and Lapidaria.

== Species ==
Eleven species are accepted.

- Schwantesia acutipetala L.Bolus
- Schwantesia borcherdsii L.Bolus
- Schwantesia constanceae N.Zimm.
- Schwantesia herrei L.Bolus
- Schwantesia loeschiana Tischer
- Schwantesia marlothii L.Bolus
- Schwantesia pillansii L.Bolus
- Schwantesia ruedebuschii Dinter
- Schwantesia speciosa L.Bolus
- Schwantesia succumbens (Dinter) Dinter ex H.Jacobsen
- Schwantesia triebneri L.Bolus
