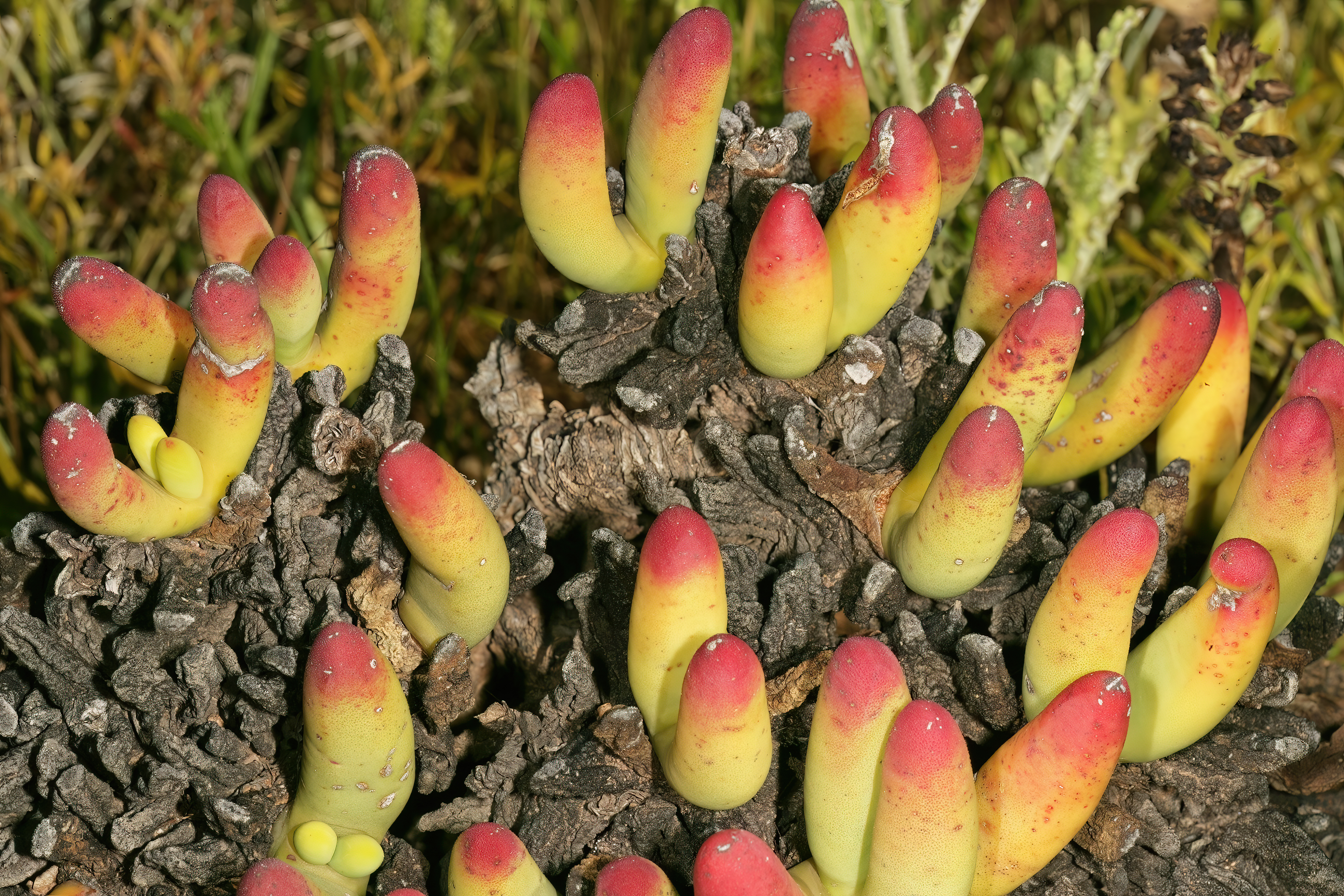
- Cylindrophyllum calamiforme

Scientific classification
- Kingdom: Plantae
- Clade: Tracheophytes
- Clade: Angiosperms
- Clade: Eudicots
- Order: Caryophyllales
- Family: Aizoaceae
- Subfamily: Ruschioideae
- Tribe: Ruschieae
- Genus: Cylindrophyllum; Schwantes

= Cylindrophyllum =

Genus of flowering plants

Cylindrophyllum is a genus of flowering plants belonging to the family Aizoaceae. It is native to the Cape Provinces of South Africa.

== Species ==
Five species are accepted.

- Cylindrophyllum calamiforme (L.) Schwantes
- Cylindrophyllum comptonii L.Bolus
- Cylindrophyllum hallii L.Bolus
- Cylindrophyllum obsubulatum (Haw.) Schwantes
- Cylindrophyllum tugwelliae L.Bolus
