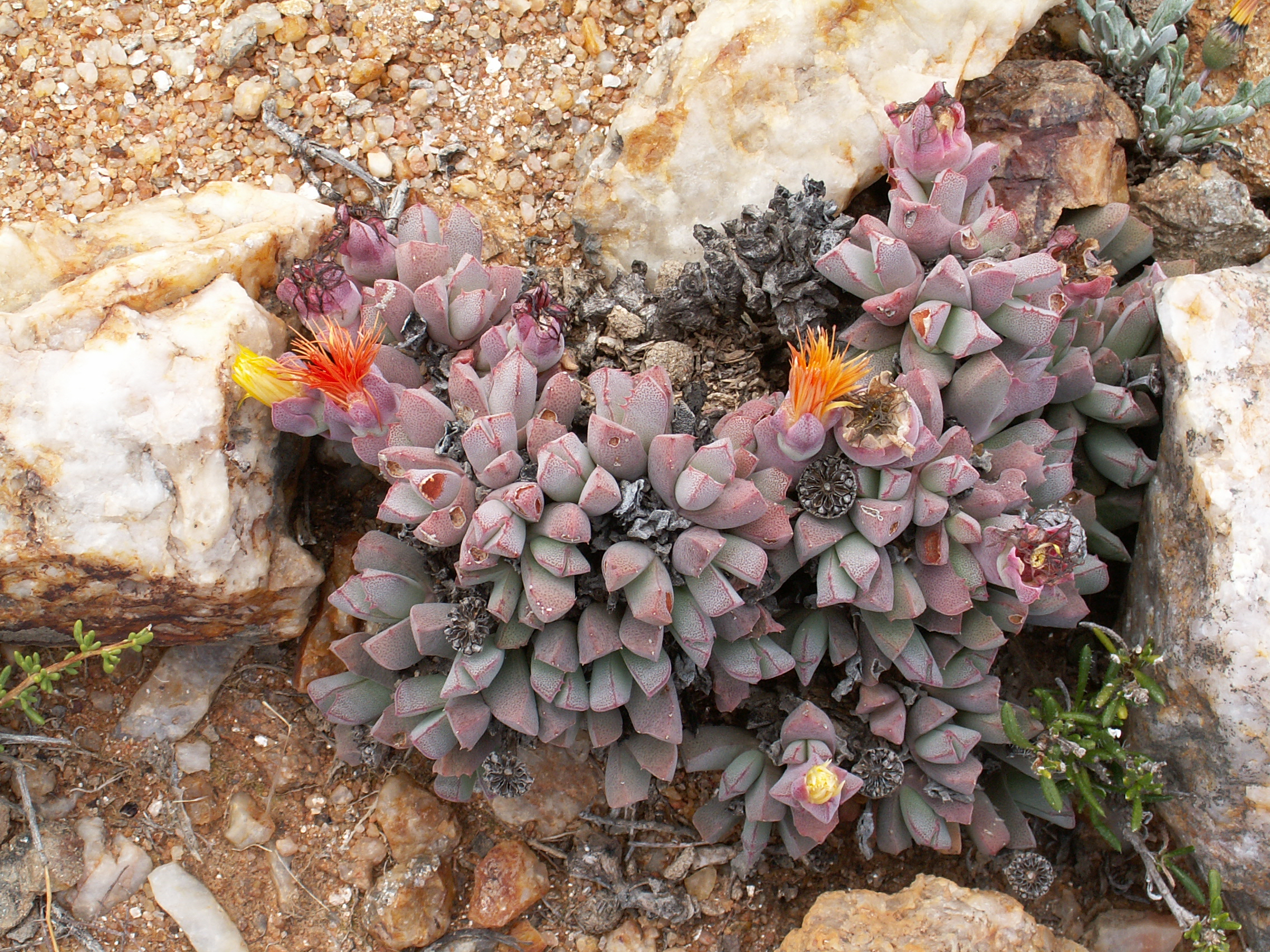

Scientific classification
- Kingdom: Plantae
- Clade: Embryophytes
- Clade: Tracheophytes
- Clade: Angiosperms
- Clade: Eudicots
- Order: Caryophyllales
- Family: Aizoaceae
- Subfamily: Ruschioideae
- Tribe: Ruschieae
- Genus: Stomatium; Schwantes

Species
- See text

Synonyms
- Agnirictus Schwantes

= Stomatium =

Genus of succulent plants from southern Africa

Stomatium is a genus of succulent plants in the ice plant family, Aizoaceae. Members of the genus are native to the Cape Provinces and Free State in South Africa.

== Species ==
38 species are accepted.

- Stomatium acutifolium L.Bolus
- Stomatium agninum Schwantes
- Stomatium alboroseum L.Bolus
- Stomatium angustifolium L.Bolus
- Stomatium beaufortense L.Bolus
- Stomatium bolusiae Schwantes
- Stomatium braunsii L.Bolus
- Stomatium bryantii L.Bolus
- Stomatium deficiens L.Bolus
- Stomatium difforme L.Bolus
- Stomatium duthieae L.Bolus
- Stomatium ermininum Schwantes
- Stomatium fulleri L.Bolus
- Stomatium geoffreyi L.Bolus
- Stomatium gerstneri L.Bolus
- Stomatium grandidens L.Bolus
- Stomatium integrum L.Bolus
- Stomatium jamesii L.Bolus
- Stomatium latifolium L.Bolus
- Stomatium lesliei (Schwantes) Volk
- Stomatium leve L.Bolus
- Stomatium loganii L.Bolus
- Stomatium meyeri L.Bolus
- Stomatium middelburgense L.Bolus
- Stomatium murinum (Haw.) Schwantes ex Jacobsen
- Stomatium mustelinum Schwantes
- Stomatium patulum L.Bolus ex Jacobsen
- Stomatium paucidens L.Bolus
- Stomatium peersii L.Bolus
- Stomatium pluridens L.Bolus
- Stomatium resedolens L.Bolus
- Stomatium ronaldii L.Bolus
- Stomatium rouxii L.Bolus
- Stomatium ryderae L.Bolus
- Stomatium suaveolens Schwantes
- Stomatium suricatinum L.Bolus
- Stomatium trifarium L.Bolus
- Stomatium villetii L.Bolus
- Stomatium viride L.Bolus
