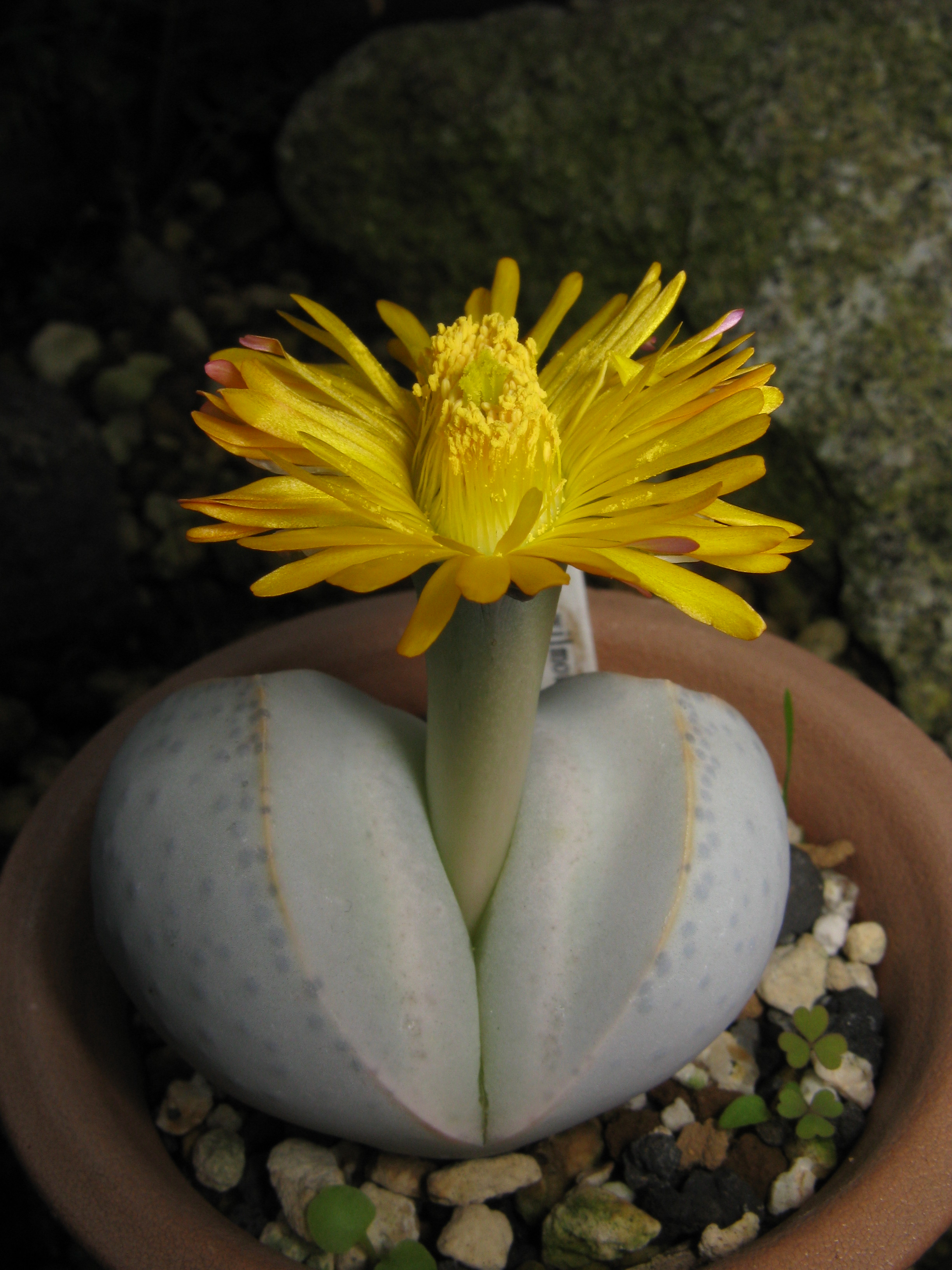
- A flowering Dintheranthus wilmotianus

Scientific classification
- Kingdom: Plantae
- Clade: Embryophytes
- Clade: Tracheophytes
- Clade: Spermatophytes
- Clade: Angiosperms
- Clade: Eudicots
- Order: Caryophyllales
- Family: Aizoaceae
- Subfamily: Ruschioideae
- Tribe: Ruschieae
- Genus: Dinteranthus; Schwantes

Type species
- Dinteranthus microspermus

= Dinteranthus =

Genus of succulents

Dinteranthus is a genus of plants in the family Aizoaceae. It occurs in the arid northwestern parts of the Northern Cape Province, South Africa and the south-eastern parts of Namibia.

== Description ==
The plants are mesembs, and resemble those genera within the family Aizoaceae to which they are most closely related; namely Lithops, Lapidaria and Schwantesia, although they require even less water and have a distinctive keel along the lower leaf surface. Unlike Lithops, Dinteranthus have smaller seeds, no taproot, and shallow fibrous roots.

The genus name of Dinteranthus is in honour of Kurt Dinter (1868–1945), a German botanist and explorer in South West Africa and the Greek word 'anthos' meaning flower.

== Species ==
Dinteranthus contains the following accepted species:

Image	Scientific name	Distribution
	Dinteranthus inexpectatus (Dinter) Schwantes	Namibia
	Dinteranthus microspermus (Dinter & Derenberg) Schwantes	Namibia
	Dinteranthus pole-evansii (N.E.Br.) Schwantes	Cape Provinces
	Dinteranthus puberulus N.E.Br.	Cape Provinces
	Dinteranthus vallis-mariae (Dinter & Schwantes) B.Fearn	Namibia.
	Dinteranthus vanzylii (L.Bolus) Schwantes	Cape Provinces
	Dinteranthus wilmotianus L.Bolus	Cape Provinces
