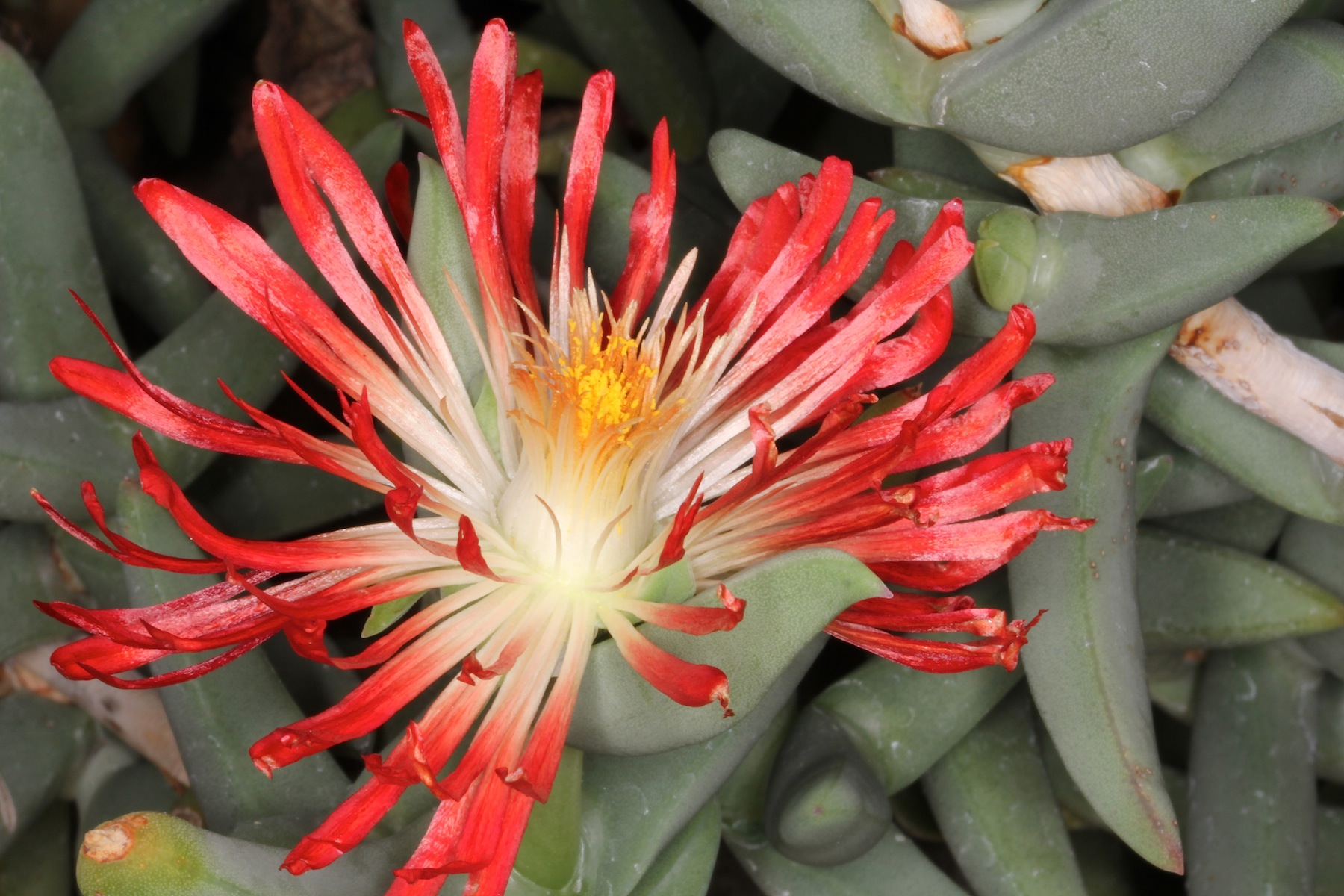

Scientific classification
- Kingdom: Plantae
- Clade: Tracheophytes
- Clade: Angiosperms
- Clade: Eudicots
- Order: Caryophyllales
- Family: Aizoaceae
- Subfamily: Ruschioideae
- Tribe: Ruschieae
- Genus: Astridia; Dinter (1926)

= Astridia =

Genus of succulents

Astridia is a genus of plants in the family Aizoaceae. It includes 14 species native to Namibia and the Cape Provinces of South Africa. It is named after the wife Astrid of the German botanist and archaeologist Gustav Schwantes (1881–1960).

== Species ==
14 species are accepted.

- Astridia alba (L.Bolus) L.Bolus
- Astridia citrina (L.Bolus) L.Bolus
- Astridia dinteri L.Bolus
- Astridia dulcis L.Bolus
- Astridia hallii L.Bolus
- Astridia herrei L.Bolus
- Astridia hillii L.Bolus
- Astridia longifolia (L.Bolus) L.Bolus
- Astridia lutata (L.Bolus) H.Friedrich ex H.E.K.Hartmann
- Astridia parviflora Klak
- Astridia rubra (L.Bolus) L.Bolus
- Astridia speciosa L.Bolus
- Astridia vanheerdei L.Bolus
- Astridia velutina Dinter
