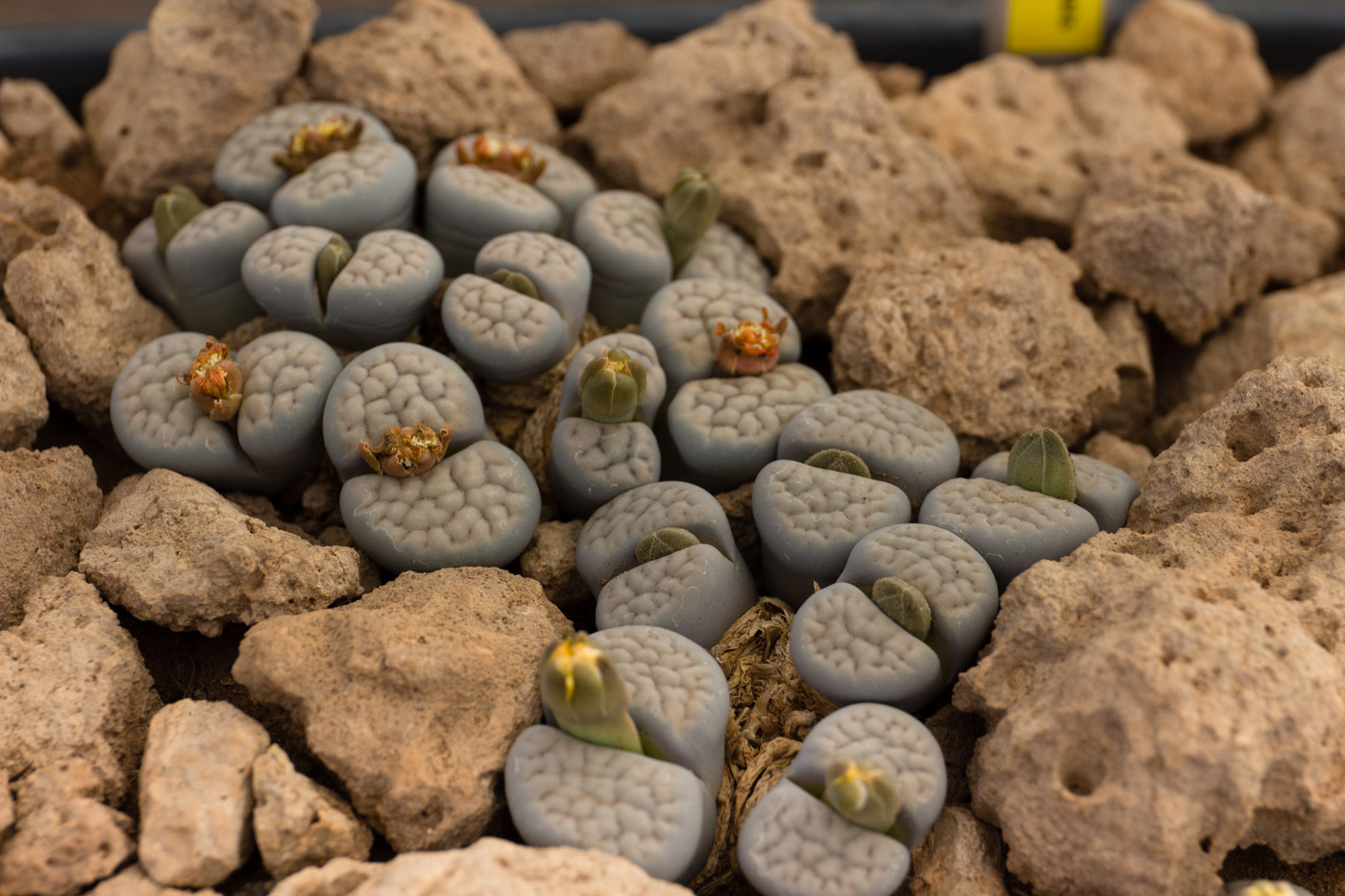

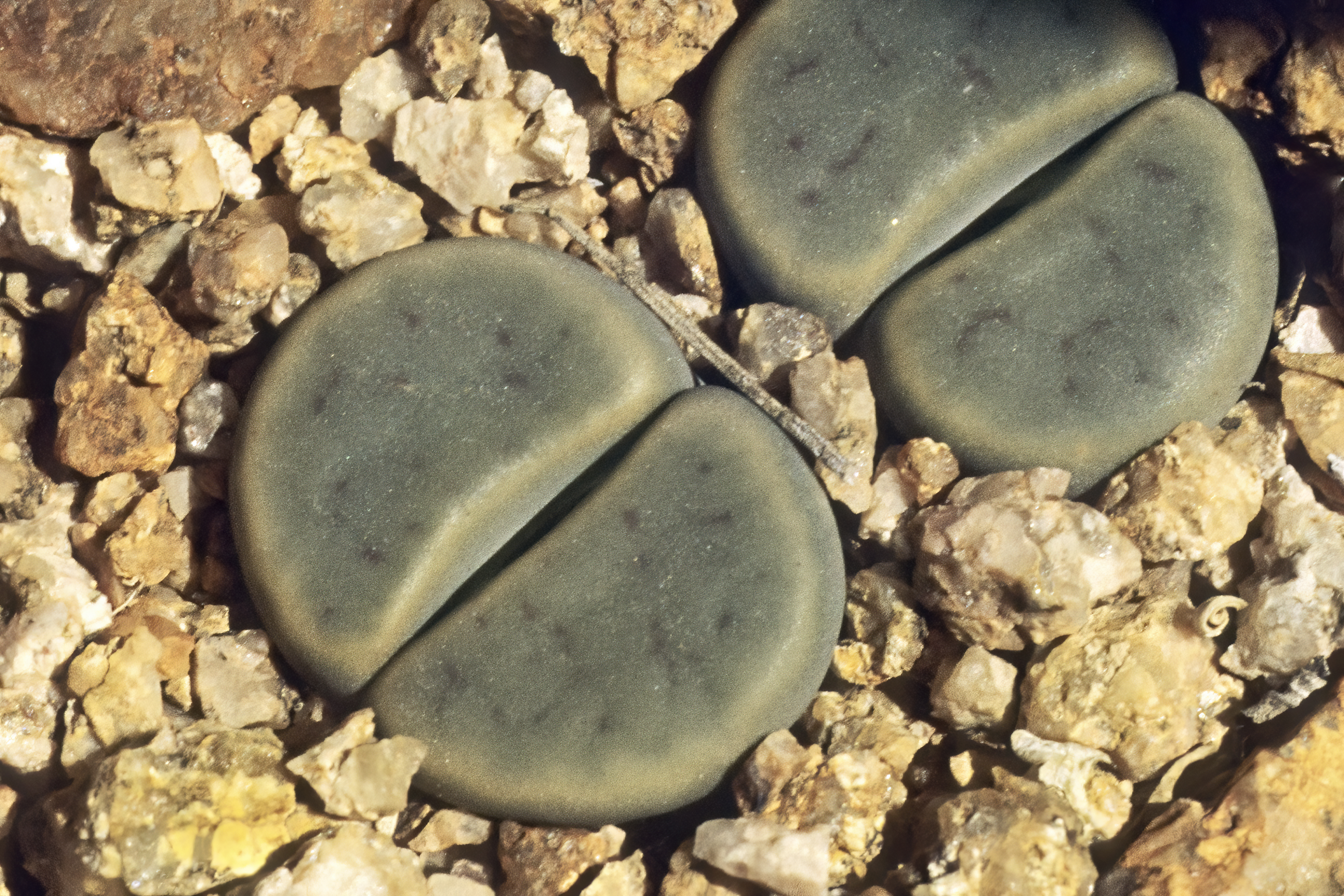

Scientific classification
- Kingdom: Plantae
- Clade: Embryophytes
- Clade: Tracheophytes
- Clade: Angiosperms
- Clade: Eudicots
- Order: Caryophyllales
- Family: Aizoaceae
- Genus: Lithops
- Species: L. schwantesii

Binomial name
- Lithops schwantesii Dinter

= Lithops schwantesii =

Species of plant

Lithops schwantesii is a succulent plant of the genus Lithops and a member of the family Aizoaceae. L. schwantesii receives its name from Gustav Schwantes, a prominent archaeologist and botanist of late 19th and 20th century. The succulent also received the Royal Horticultural Society's Award of Garden Merit for being a resilient and easy to cultivate plant.

== Description ==
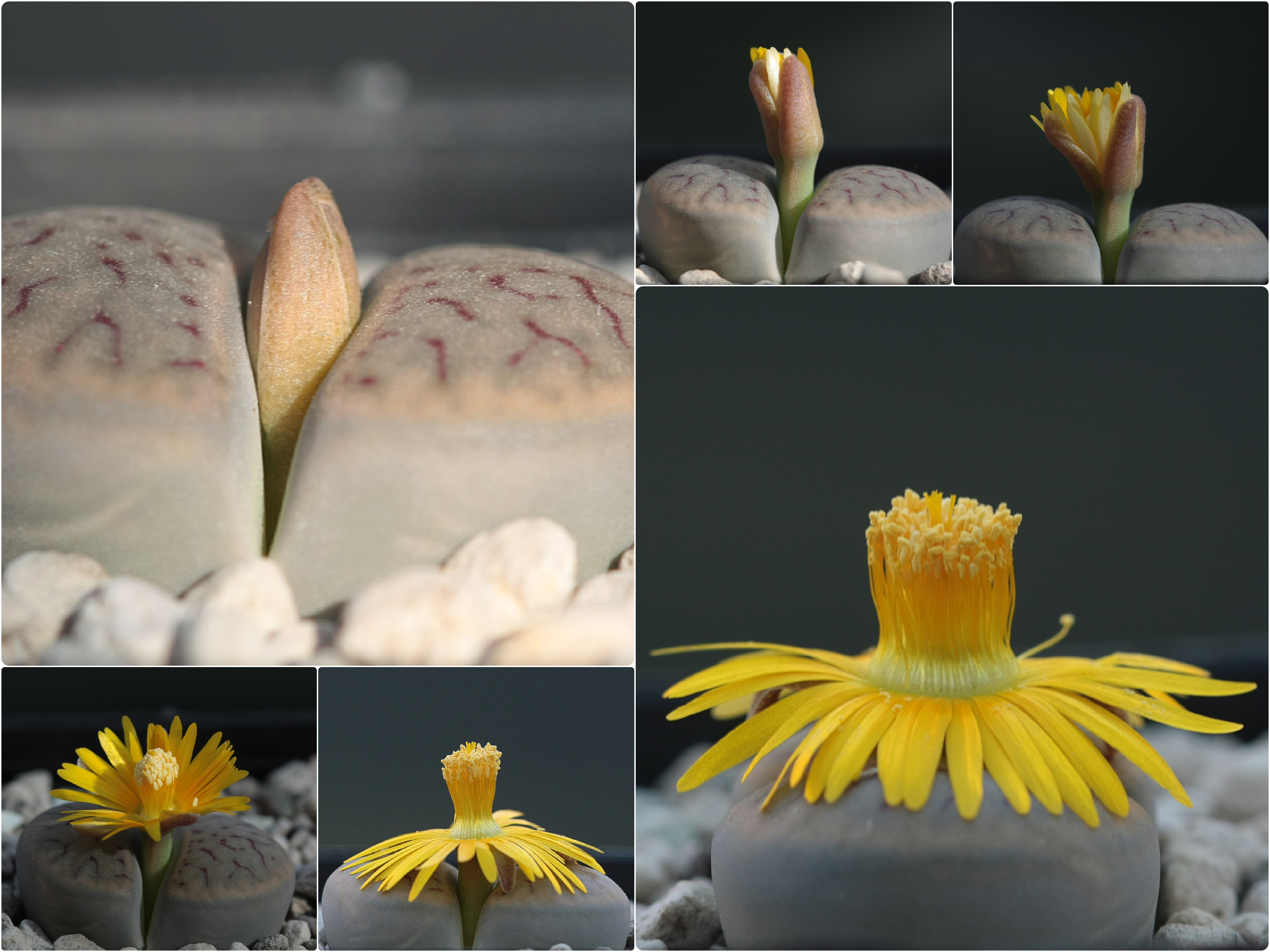
Lithops schwantesii

This particular species, like that of all in its genus, grows best in direct sunlight. It originates and grows in South Africa. The plant has channels that run along the tops of its leaves. The channels are irregular, and do not usually run in a common pattern. Leaves are usually grey with tinges of red, blue pink, brown, or green. Its flowers are small-medium in size and yellow in color.
