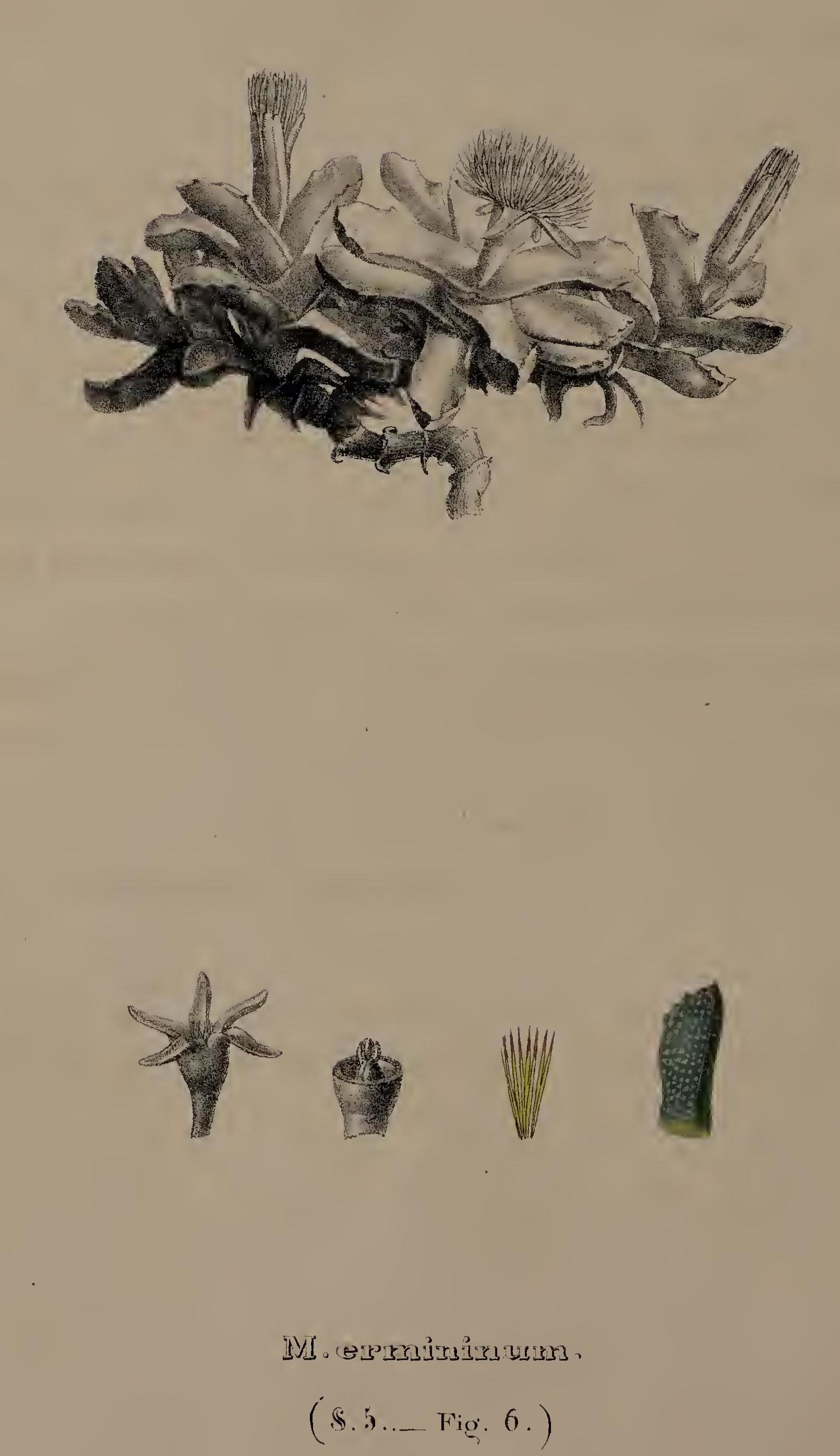
- Botanical illustration

Scientific classification
- Kingdom: Plantae
- Clade: Embryophytes
- Clade: Tracheophytes
- Clade: Angiosperms
- Clade: Eudicots
- Order: Caryophyllales
- Family: Aizoaceae
- Genus: Stomatium
- Species: S. ermininum

Binomial name
- Stomatium ermininum (Haw.) Schwantes

Synonyms
- Mesembryanthemum ermininum Haw.

= Stomatium ermininum =

Species of flowering plant

Stomatium ermininum, called the ermine chop, is a species of flowering plant in the ice plant genus Stomatium, native to the Cape Provinces of South Africa. Its yellow flowers open in the evening and are banana-scented. It has gained the Royal Horticultural Society's Award of Garden Merit.
