= Duvensee archaeological sites =

Series of archaeological sites in Duvensee, Germany

Duvensee
- Location within Germany
- 53°41′55″N 10°32′51″E
- Type: Settlement
- Periods: Mesolithic
- Location: Duvensee, Herzogtum Lauenburg, Schleswig-Holstein, Germany

History
- Built: Approximately 11,000 years ago
- Abandoned: Approximately 8,500 years ago

The Duvensee archaeological sites (German: Duvenseer Wohnplätze) are a series of early Mesolithic archaeological sites that are located within the Duvensee bog near Duvensee in Schleswig Holstein, Germany. The bog is one of the oldest and well-researched archaeological settlement areas from the early Holocene in Central Europe. The archaeological sites are renowned for their well-preserved organic remains and are of great importance in understanding the subsistence and settlement strategies of post-glacial hunter-gatherer societies. Recent research has explored the Duvensee societies' diet and land use patterns in relation to the evolution of modern lifestyles and nutrition.

== Location and Preservation ==
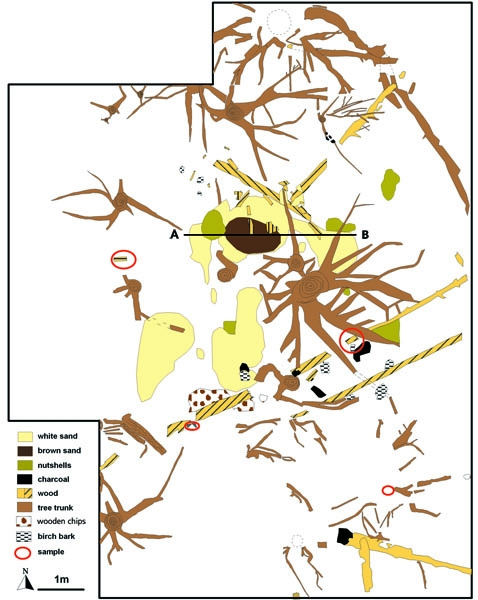
Map of Duvensee Wohnplatz 6

The Duvensee bog is located at the edge of the Duvensee municipality in the Herzogtum Lauenburg district in the southern part of Schleswig-Holstein. The bog formed from a paludifying lake that originated as a kettle hole during the early pre-boreal and once covered an area of more than 4 square kilometres. Siltation set in during the late pre-boreal and the lake was (intentionally) drained in its entirety during the 19th century.

The north-western banks of the lake served as areas for human activity during the early Mesolithic. On two peninsulas the remains of small to medium-sized sites in close vicinity to one another were found.

With increasing paludification, which is thought to have set in during the periods of occupation, the sites were covered and protected by thick layers of peat and survive in excellent condition. Due to increased peat harvesting during the 19th and 20th centuries, the as yet unexcavated portions are now close to the surface and no longer protected by this natural cover.

== Chronometric Dates ==
Radiocarbon dates place the period of most intensive settlement firmly into the early Mesolithic. Using the CalPal software, the Radiocarbon dates can be calibrated and expressed in calendar years, a convention followed here. Based on these results, the earliest living sites (Wp8 and Wp9) date to the late pre-boreal approximately 11,000 years ago. Wp19 is the youngest of the sites and dates to about 8,500 years ago. This is followed by a long settlement hiatus that lasted until during the Neolithic (Einzelgrabkultur).

An alternative approach, pollen analysis, has placed plant remains from the sites into the late pre-boral, boreal and Atlantic.

== History of Research ==
The current investigations of the Archaeological Research Centre and Museum for Human Behavioural Evolution MONREPOS of the Römisch-Germanisches Zentralmuseum builds upon a long history of excavation and research.

Stone tools and other markers of settlement activity were discovered in 1924 and due to the supposed “living floor” characteristics of some of the sites, the excavator Gustav Schwantes interpreted the sites as dwelling sites (Wohnplätze). Irrespective of the current interpretation of the sites as ephemeral hazel nut roasting camps, German archaeological discourse continues to refer to the sites as “Wohnplätze”. Each individual site is designated as Wp (Wohnplatz) and a running number (e.g. Wp1, Wp2, Wp3...). Due to the excellent preservation and unusual find categories, the materials form Duvensee were quickly described as part of their own archaeological culture – the Duvensee Kultur or Duvensee-Gruppen. The finds from the 1924 excavations were recently re-analysed.

Already during those early campaigns thick layers of hazelnut shells were discovered in all dwelling sites. These were positioned around central hearths that were used in hazelnut roasting.

The Research history of research at Duvensee was strongly influenced by the work of Klaus Bokelmann, who worked extensively with the materials found at Duvensee. To date, 12 “living sites” have been excavated. More recently, research has focused on Wp6, Wp8 and Wp9 to investigate the subsistence, spatial use and technological aspects of the Duvensee culture.

== Notable Finds ==
Protected by the waterlogged peat deposits, a wealth of organic remains survives in excellent condition:

- The Duvensee paddle made from pine wood was found in Wp2 and is among the oldest direct evidence for water transport
- Pine and birch bark mats of up to 5 square metres in size were discovered at several sites (Wp 8, Wp11, Wp13 and Wp19) in association with hearths and roasting fires. They may have served as insulation against the dampness emanating from the bog.
- Two arrow shafts made from hazel and pine wood were discovered at Wp6
- An axe shaft made from pine wood preserves evidence for the preparation of shafts of Mesolithic axes (tranchet axe and core axe)
- Bone points with fine serrations have been placed into their own regional type or industry (“Typ Duvensee”)
- In October 2022, the oldest burial site in Schleswig-Holstein to date was discovered here, a cremation burial that was created around 10,500 years ago on the edge of the Duvenseer Moor.

However, the majority of finds are lithic tools and by-products of their production made from flint. These form the basis for technological and spatial analyses at the site. The paddle and all finds from Wp1 through Wp5 are curated at the Archaeological Museum Hamburg, whilst all other finds are stored at the Archäologisches Landesmuseum Schleswig.

== Settlement patterns at Duvensee ==
The sites are currently thought to represent specialised storage camps of Mesolithic hunter-gatherer groups at which large quantities of hazelnuts were processed. Duvensee lake was visited for approximately two weeks per year during late summer or early autumn in order to harvest and process hazelnuts. The archaeological evidence implies evidence for cracking, roasting and grinding of hazelnuts as well as extensive production of stone tools. There is no evidence that the sites served as actual living structures or longer-term settlements - spatial analyses indicate that nut processing activities took place in the open.

== Hazelnut utilisation ==
Based on the structures, tools and nut remains at Duvensee it was possible to 1) demonstrate the importance of stored plant foods in Mesolithic economies and 2) to quantify the extent to which such activities were carried out. The structures, hazelnut shells and stone tools show that fat-rich nuts were harvested in large numbers and processed into transportable and storable supplies.

- Nut shells and seeds: Remains of nut shells and seeds were recovered from almost all sites where, at times, they formed entire layers. Together with roasting hearths they form a recurring feature at Duvensee. In addition to hazelnuts, there is also evidence for the processing of other plants as well. Burned seeds of Nuphar lutea (yellow water-lilly) and genus Typha (bulrush) were recovered from the hearth of Wp6, whilst Wp5 yielded a substantial amount of Polygonum convolvulus (black-bindweed) seed.
- Roasting hearths: Almost all sites exhibit structures that were used to roast hazel nuts. At these special hearths, large quantities of sand were heated in order to roast the nuts. The construction of these facilities required a large number of materials and good logistical coordination. Several hundreds of litres of sand had to be transported to the roasting site. Protective undercovers in form of bark mats (see special finds above) at Wp8 and the setting-up of wooden frames around the roasting sites (Wp6) are evident at Duvensee. Alternatively, nuts were roasted on heated clay plates (Wp11).
- Nutcrackers: These are heavy sandstone or Quartzite pebbles with round hollows with which nuts were cracked. Some pieces also show features diagnostic of grinding, indicating further processing of the roasted nuts into nut flour. At the roughly contemporary site Fon del Ros in Spain, it was possible to identify starch residues from nut flour on such nut crackers.
- Modelling the utilisation of hazel nuts: The extent of hazel nut provisions obtained and produced at Duvensee can be modelled from the amount of shell found at the sites, time invested in harvesting and processing and yield capacity of early Holocene hazel nut plants. Models show the economic importance of hazel nuts, which may have met up to 50% of the energy requirements of the hunter gatherer groups. The margin of return is very high and even surpasses the yields obtained during plant cultivation.

The intensive exploitation of energy-rich plant foods had far reaching implications for the subsistence and survival strategies of Mesolithic hunter-gatherer groups. This innovative type of economy is a characteristic of the Mesolithic and hints at the development of plant cultivation with the onset of the Neolithic.

== GIS-Analyses ==
Comparative analyses of settlement dynamics were conducted at Wp6 and Wp8. These analyses are based on the three-dimensional distribution of lithic artefacts and refits, as well as geo-statistical investigations, such as Kriging of find layer thickness.

These analyses show almost 1000 years of repeated occupations that revolved around roasting of hazel nuts, the primary function of the sites. The analyses also indicate that periods of occupation were short and that each site represents a single occupation.

== Technology and lithic typologies ==
Technological and typological analyses of stone tools allow for a reconstruction of the manufacturing processes at Duvensee. At all sites, between 5,000 and 10,000 lithic artefacts were recovered. Local, low quality flint served as the primary raw material and was worked into irregularly shaped blades. The production of arrow points, so-called microliths, and associated maintenance of hunting equipment was a major activity at all sites.

There are also a number of core- and disc axes, typically Mesolithic tool types that were used in wood processing. Investigations of typological changes in lithic tool shape were also able to demonstrate different phases of development of Mesolithic traditions. As a result of the excellent chronological resolution and single occupation episodes, Duvensee serves as a references site for the categorization of other Mesolithic sites.
