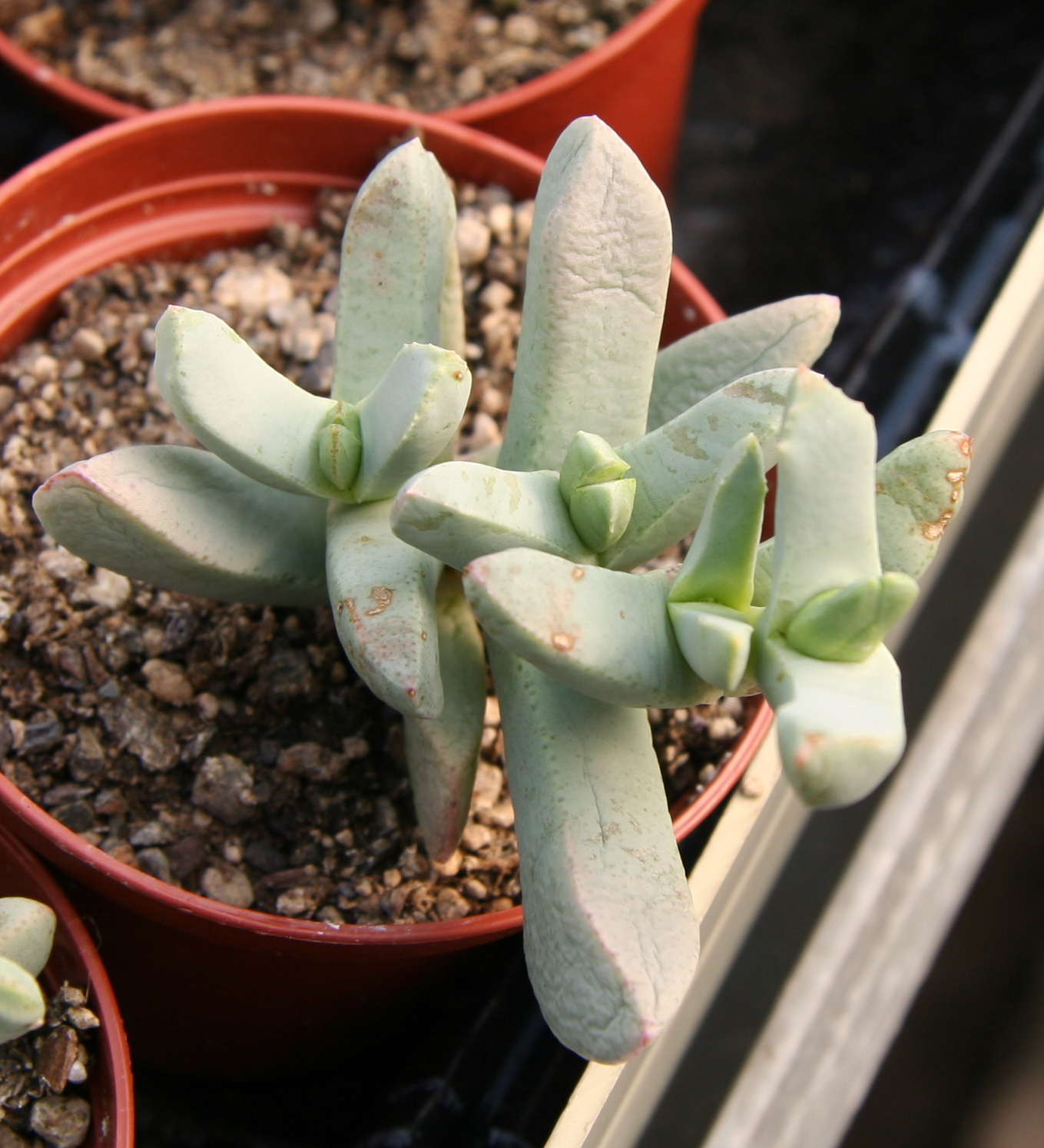
- Juttadinteria deserticola

Scientific classification
- Kingdom: Plantae
- Clade: Tracheophytes
- Clade: Angiosperms
- Clade: Eudicots
- Order: Caryophyllales
- Family: Aizoaceae
- Subfamily: Ruschioideae
- Tribe: Ruschieae
- Genus: Juttadinteria; Schwantes

Type species
- Juttadinteria simpsonii (Dinter) Schwantes

= Juttadinteria =

Genus of succulents

Juttadinteria is a genus of plants in the family Aizoaceae.

== Distribution and habitat ==
Juttadinteria species are native to the ǁKaras Region of Namibia and the Northern Cape Province of South Africa. They grow in calcareous sands and loams on both flat and sloped ground.

== Species ==
This genus includes the following species:

- Juttadinteria albata (L.Bolus) L.Bolus – Namibia and South Africa
- Juttadinteria attenuata Walgate – Namibia and South Africa
- Juttadinteria ausensis (L.Bolus) Schwantes – Namibia
- Juttadinteria deserticola (Marloth) Schwantes – Namibia and South Africa
- Juttadinteria simpsonii (Dinter) Schwantes – Namibia
