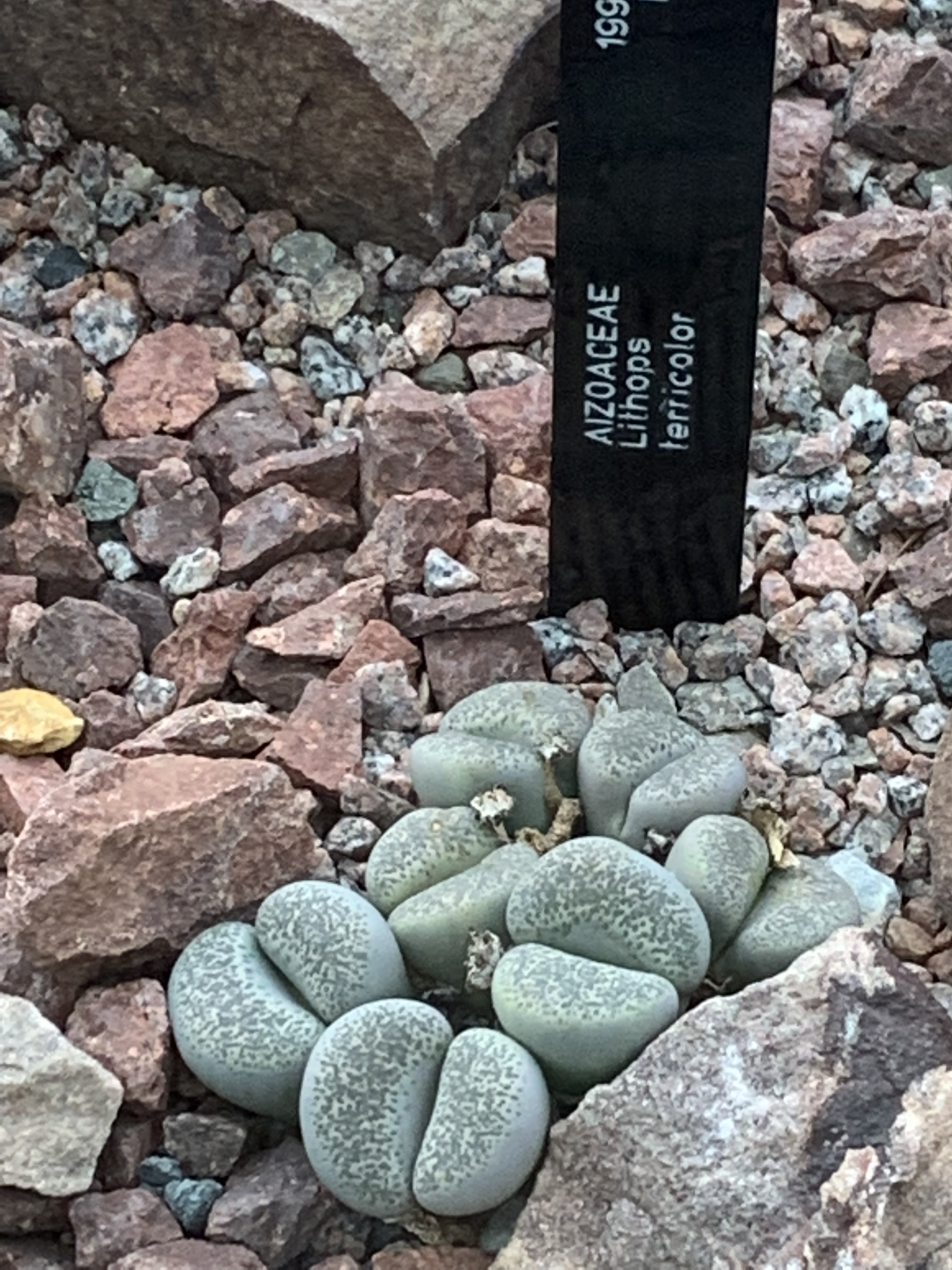

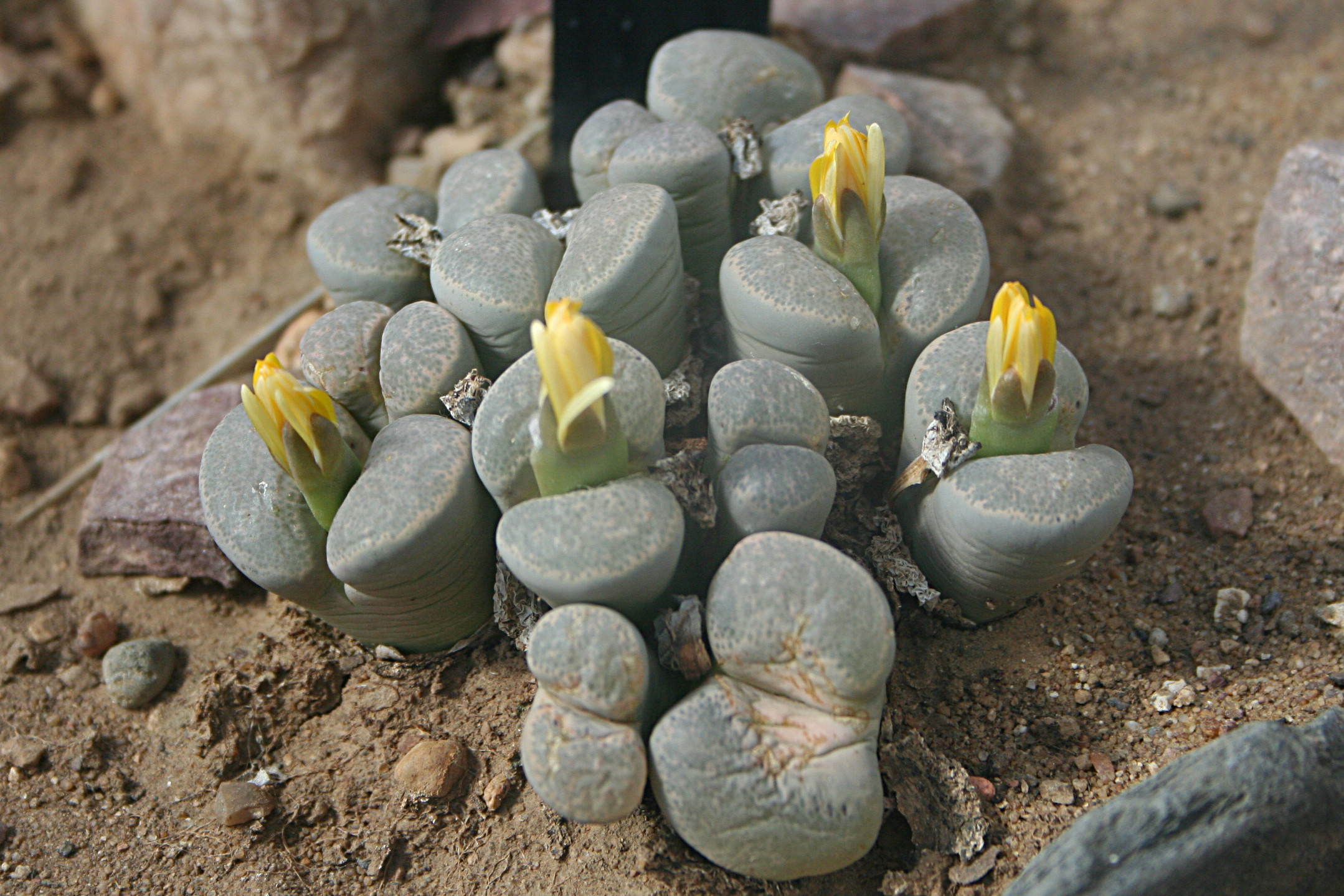

Scientific classification
- Kingdom: Plantae
- Clade: Embryophytes
- Clade: Tracheophytes
- Clade: Spermatophytes
- Clade: Angiosperms
- Clade: Eudicots
- Order: Caryophyllales
- Family: Aizoaceae
- Genus: Lithops
- Species: L. localis

Binomial name
- Lithops localis (N.E.Br.) Schwantes

= Lithops localis =

Species of succulent

Lithops localis (also known as Lithops terricolor) is a species of plant in the family Aizoaceae, indigenous to South Africa.

== Distribution ==
Lithops localis is naturally found in the southern Karoo region in the Cape Provinces of South Africa. Its natural range extends in an east–west belt, through the Little Karoo, and in the adjacent sliver of the Great Karoo just to the north. It is the only Lithops species which occurs in this stretch of southern Africa.

This range is an arid area of predominantly summer rainfall. Here it often grows among rocks or in the shade of another plant.

== Cultivation ==
It is sometimes used as a houseplant or for landscaping. Like all Lithops, it requires extremely well-drained soil. Like all Lithops it also grows in annual cycles, as the leaf-pairs flower, and then each produces a new leaf-pair that replaces the old one (which shrivels away). The principal rule of watering is that Lithops should be kept dry from when they finish flowering, up until the old leaf-pairs are fully replaced.

Of the Lithops species, L. localis is one of the species which is relatively tolerant of occasional incorrect watering, and is therefore relatively easy to cultivate.
