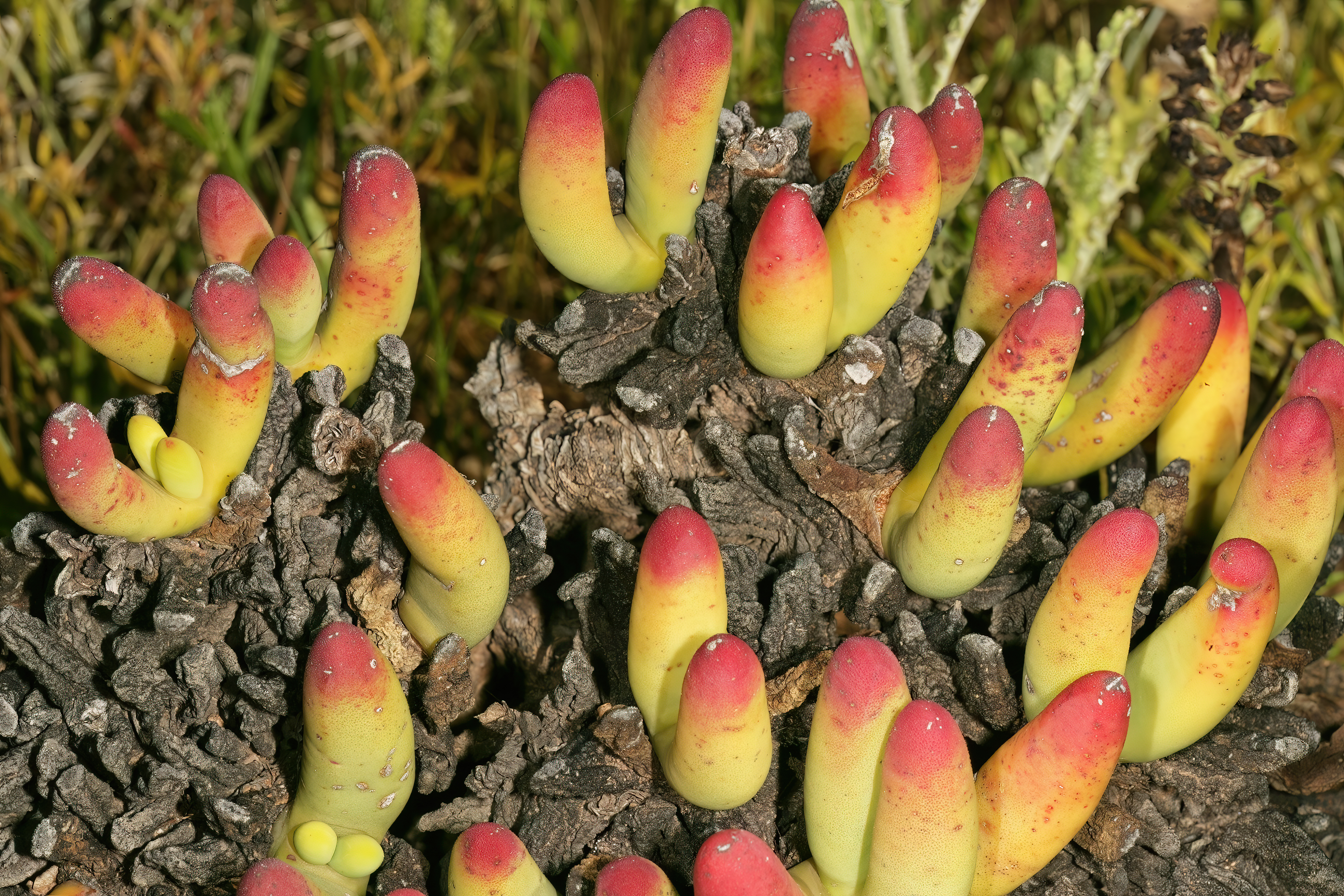

Scientific classification
- Kingdom: Plantae
- Clade: Tracheophytes
- Clade: Angiosperms
- Clade: Eudicots
- Order: Caryophyllales
- Family: Aizoaceae
- Genus: Cylindrophyllum
- Species: C. calamiforme

Binomial name
- Cylindrophyllum calamiforme (L.) Schwantes

Synonyms
- Cylindrophyllum dyeri L.Bolus; Mesembryanthemum calamiforme L.

= Cylindrophyllum calamiforme =

Species of succulent

Cylindrophyllum calamiforme is a small succulent plant belonging to the Aizoaceae family. The species is endemic to South Africa and occurs in the Eastern Cape. The range of the plant is relatively unknown (currently estimated at 4452 km^{2}) and it may be threatened by shale gas extraction.
