= Astridia hallii =

Conservation status
- Least Concern (IUCN 3.1)

Scientific classification
- Kingdom: Plantae
- Clade: Tracheophytes
- Clade: Angiosperms
- Clade: Eudicots
- Order: Caryophyllales
- Family: Aizoaceae
- Genus: Astridia
- Species: A. hallii

Binomial name
- Astridia hallii L.Bolus

Species of succulent

Astridia hallii is a species of plant in the family Aizoaceae. It is endemic to Namibia. Its natural habitat is rocky areas.
