= Duvensee =

- Municipality
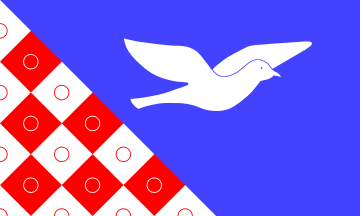
- Flag Coat of arms

- Location of Duvensee within Herzogtum Lauenburg district
- Interactive map of Duvensee
- Location within Germany Location within Schleswig-Holstein
- Coordinates: 53°42′N 10°34′E
- Country: Germany
- State: Schleswig-Holstein
- District: Herzogtum Lauenburg
- Municipal assoc.: Sandesneben-Nusse

Government
  - Mayor: Hans-Peter Grell

Area
  - Total: 12.4 km^{2} (4.8 sq mi)
- Elevation: 43 m (141 ft)

Population (2025-12-31)
  - Total: 558
  - Density: 45.0/km^{2} (117/sq mi)
- Time zone: UTC+01:00 (CET)
  - Summer (DST): UTC+02:00 (CEST)
- Postal codes: 23898
- Dialling codes: 04543
- Vehicle registration: RZ
- Website: www.amt-nusse.de

Duvensee is a municipality in the district of Lauenburg, in Schleswig-Holstein, Germany. It is best known for its Mesolithic archaeologic sites located in the Duvensee Bog, which have helped in the discovery of diets and settlement strategies of European post-glacial hunter gatherers. The Duvensee paddle was also discovered there in 1926.
