= Stomatium alboroseum =

Scientific classification
- Kingdom: Plantae
- Clade: Embryophytes
- Clade: Tracheophytes
- Clade: Angiosperms
- Clade: Eudicots
- Order: Caryophyllales
- Family: Aizoaceae
- Genus: Stomatium
- Species: S. alboroseum

Binomial name
- Stomatium alboroseum L.Bolus

Synonyms
- Stomatium niveum L.Bolus

Species of flowering plant

Stomatium alboroseum is a species of succulent plant in the family Aizoaceae, native to the Cape Provinces of South Africa. Under its synonym Stomatium niveum it has gained the Royal Horticultural Society's Award of Garden Merit.
