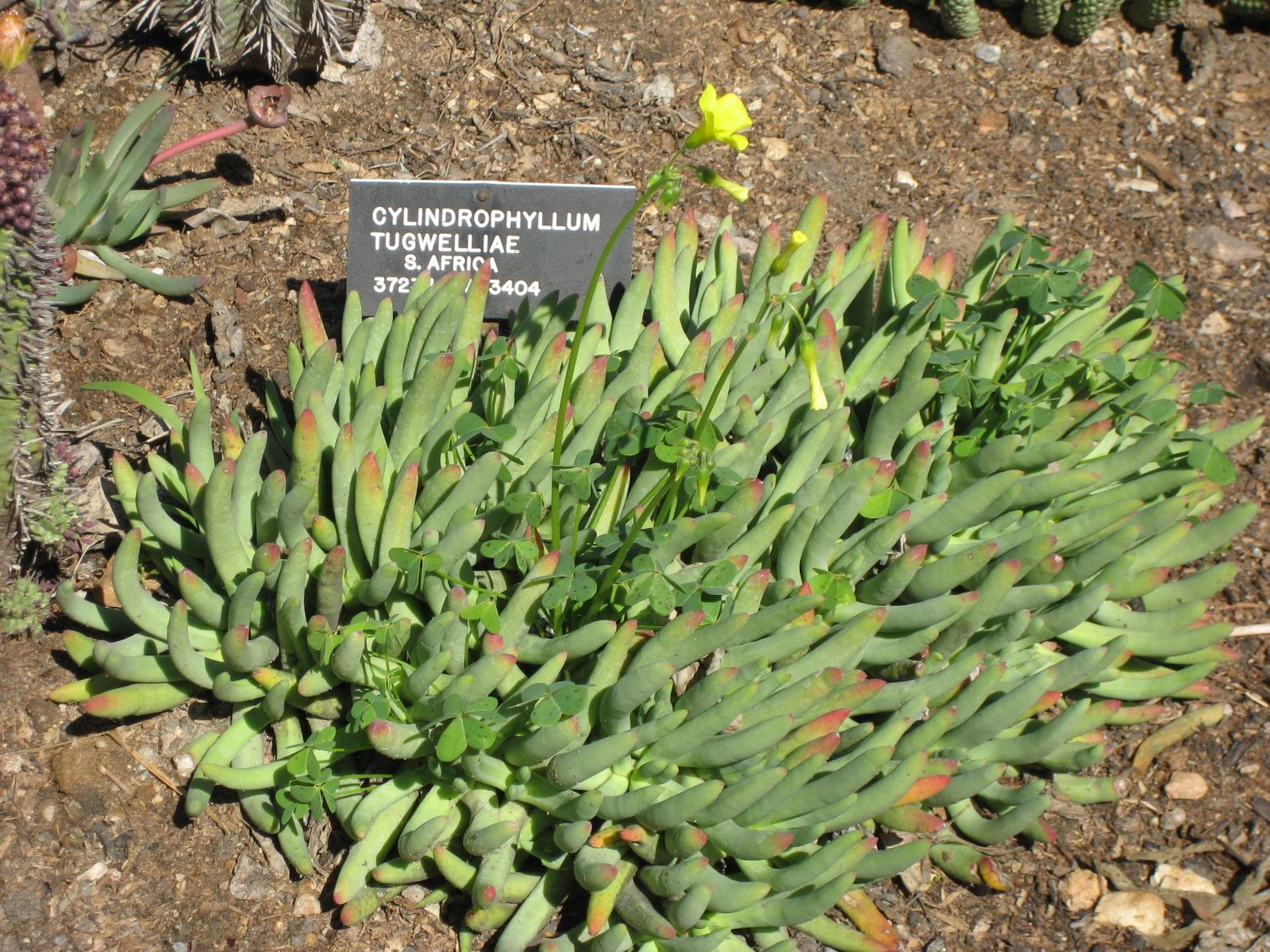

Scientific classification
- Kingdom: Plantae
- Clade: Tracheophytes
- Clade: Angiosperms
- Clade: Eudicots
- Order: Caryophyllales
- Family: Aizoaceae
- Genus: Cylindrophyllum
- Species: C. tugwelliae

Binomial name
- Cylindrophyllum tugwelliae L.Bolus

= Cylindrophyllum tugwelliae =

Species of succulent

Cylindrophyllum tugwelliae is a small succulent plant that is part of the Aizoaceae family. The species is endemic to South Africa and occurs in the Western Cape.
