= Cylindrophyllum hallii =

Conservation status
- Vulnerable (SANBI Red List)

Scientific classification
- Kingdom: Plantae
- Clade: Tracheophytes
- Clade: Angiosperms
- Clade: Eudicots
- Order: Caryophyllales
- Family: Aizoaceae
- Genus: Cylindrophyllum
- Species: C. hallii

Binomial name
- Cylindrophyllum hallii Bolus, 1960

Species of succulent

Cylindrophyllum hallii is a small succulent plant that is part of the Aizoaceae family. The species is endemic to South Africa and occurs in the Northern Cape at Loeriesfontein. The plant is threatened by overgrazing and trampling.
