= Chasmatophyllum maninum =

Scientific classification
- Kingdom: Plantae
- Clade: Tracheophytes
- Clade: Angiosperms
- Clade: Eudicots
- Order: Caryophyllales
- Family: Aizoaceae
- Genus: Chasmatophyllum
- Species: C. maninum

Binomial name
- Chasmatophyllum maninum L.Bolus

South African plant species

Chasmatophyllum maninum is a species of plant from South Africa.

== Description ==
Each branch has six to eight leaves. They are variable in shape and have one minute tooth. Flowers are present between September and October. They have a diameter of 25 mm (0.98 in) and are solitarily borne. Each flower has five sepals. They are 8 mm (0.31 in) long. The petals are dense and occur in two or three rows.

== Distribution ==
This species is endemic to South Africa. It is known from the Middelburg region in the Eastern Cape. It has also been found in the Northern Cape, close to where this province borders the Eastern Cape.

== Conservation status ==
Currently, not enough information is known about this species to be able to accurately assess its risk of extinction. As such, it is classified as being data deficient by the South African National Biodiversity Institute.
