= Astridia dinteri =

Scientific classification
- Kingdom: Plantae
- Clade: Tracheophytes
- Clade: Angiosperms
- Clade: Eudicots
- Order: Caryophyllales
- Family: Aizoaceae
- Genus: Astridia
- Species: A. dinteri

Binomial name
- Astridia dinteri L.Bolus

Species of succulent

Astridia dinteri is a species of plant in the family Aizoaceae. It was named in 1961.
