= Schwantesia constanceae =

Conservation status
- Vulnerable (IUCN 3.1)

Scientific classification
- Kingdom: Plantae
- Clade: Tracheophytes
- Clade: Angiosperms
- Clade: Eudicots
- Order: Caryophyllales
- Family: Aizoaceae
- Genus: Schwantesia
- Species: S. constanceae

Binomial name
- Schwantesia constanceae N.Zimm.

Species of succulent

Schwantesia constanceae is a species of plant in the family Aizoaceae. It is endemic to Namibia. Its natural habitat is rocky areas. It is threatened by habitat loss.
