= Cylindrophyllum comptonii =

Scientific classification
- Kingdom: Plantae
- Clade: Tracheophytes
- Clade: Angiosperms
- Clade: Eudicots
- Order: Caryophyllales
- Family: Aizoaceae
- Genus: Cylindrophyllum
- Species: C. comptonii

Binomial name
- Cylindrophyllum comptonii L.Bolus

Species of succulent

Cylindrophyllum comptonii is a species of succulent plant belonging to the genus Cylindrophyllum of the family Aizoaceae. It is endemic to South Africa.

== Taxonomy ==
Cylindrophyllum comptonii is classified under the genus Cylindrophyllum. It belongs to the tribe Ruschiae, subfamily Ruschioideae of the family Aizoaceae. It was first described by the South African botanist Harriet Margaret Louisa Bolus in 1932.

== Description ==
Cylindrophyllum comptonii are small perennial succulent plant that form dense cushions. The plants grow up to about 13 cm (5.1 in) high and 25 cm (9.8 in) in diameter. They possess cylindrical leaves about 9 cm (3.5 in) in length and 1 cm (0.39 in) in diameter. The leaves are slightly flattened dorsoventrally with an indistinct central ridge and pointed tips. The flowers are about 7.5 cm (3.0 in) in diameter and silvery white in color.

== Distribution and habitat ==
Cylindrophyllum comptonii is endemic to the western part of Cape Province in South Africa. They grow found on flat shaly soil.
