= Dintera =

Scientific classification
- Kingdom: Plantae
- Clade: Tracheophytes
- Clade: Angiosperms
- Clade: Eudicots
- Clade: Asterids
- Order: Lamiales
- Family: Plantaginaceae
- Genus: Dintera; Otto Stapf (1900)
- Species: D. pterocaulis

Binomial name
- Dintera pterocaulis Stapf (1900)

Genus of plants

Dintera is a monotypic genus of flowering plants belonging to the family Plantaginaceae. It contains just one species, Dintera pterocaulis Stapf, which comes from Namibia.

The genus name of Dintera is in honour of Kurt Dinter (1868–1945), a German botanist and explorer in South West Africa. The Latin specific epithet of pterocaulis refers to petro meaning rock or stone and 'caulis' (a Greek word) meaning stem or stalk. It was first published and described by German botanist Otto Stapf in Mém. Herb. Boissier Vol.20 on page 29 in 1900.
