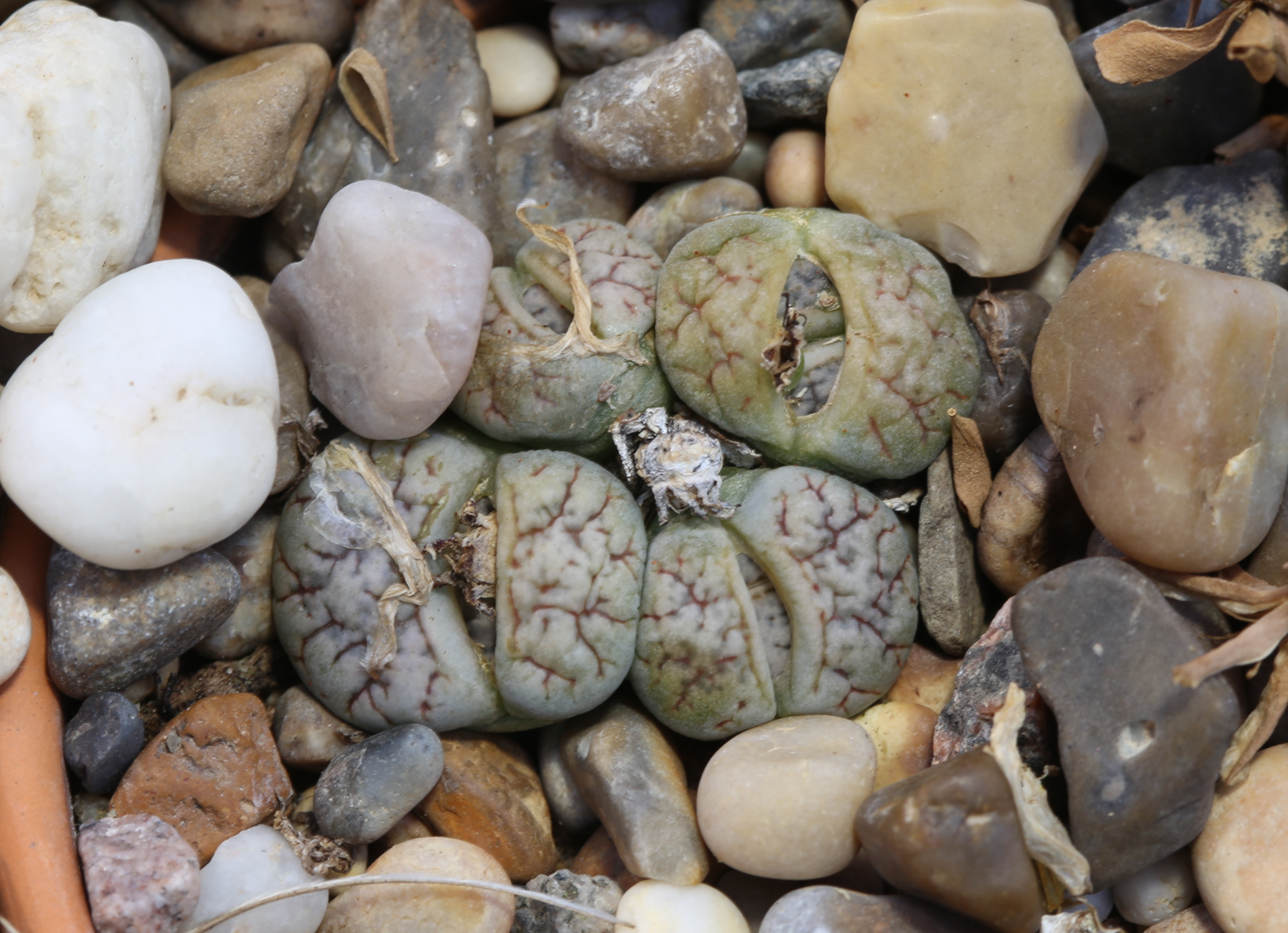
- Lithops werneri at Gothenburg Botanical Garden.

Conservation status
- Critically Endangered (IUCN 3.1)

Scientific classification
- Kingdom: Plantae
- Clade: Tracheophytes
- Clade: Angiosperms
- Clade: Eudicots
- Order: Caryophyllales
- Family: Aizoaceae
- Genus: Lithops
- Species: L. werneri

Binomial name
- Lithops werneri Schwantes ex H.Jacobsen

= Lithops werneri =

Species of succulent

Lithops werneri is a critically endangered species of plant in the family Aizoaceae. It is endemic to Namibia. Its natural habitat is rocky areas. It is only known from a single population that exists in a 4-square-kilometer (1.5-square-mile) area in the Erongo Mountains of central Namibia (in the Karibib District, roughly 25 to 40 kilometers north-northeast of Usakos).

== Description ==
Lithops werneri is one of the more diminutive Lithops species, and the plants are small in comparison to other plants in the genus Lithops. Lithops werneri is one of the smallest species in the entire genus of living stones, with tiny individual leaf bodies measuring only 15-24 mm long and 12-18 mm wide. This species growth habit is very compact, occasionally forming tight clusters of 2-10 heads with 2-3 heads most commonly seen in habitat and in cultivation.

Because the plants are difficult to find in habitat, some visitors to the plant's only known locality have reported that no plants could be located and suggested the species may be extinct. Others have reported finding plants as recently as 2012, while attempting to reestablish the species. Plants located during this 2012 survey were found to have viable and mature seed capsules which would indicate the plants are successfully being pollinated and reproducing in the wild.

== Conservation ==
Although it is fairly common in horticulture, this species is critically endangered in the wild and only occurs within a 4.0 square kilometer (1.5 square mile) area in its native habitat in the Namibian Desert. The coastal fog belts produced by ocean currents off the coast of Namibia that many desert plants, including Lithops, depend on for their survival only extend from the coast to approximately 100 kilometers inland. Known populations of this species are at the extreme eastern boundary of this fog shadow, and exist in a hyper-arid region of the Namibian Desert. The plants only rarely receive moisture from coastal fog, with most of their moisture coming primarily from rare summer rain showers and seasonal dew. Recent surveys and estimates of this plant in habitat have determined that only approximately 200 plants are left in the wild as of 2026.
