= Duvensee paddle =

Mesolithic paddle found in Schleswig-Holstein, Germany

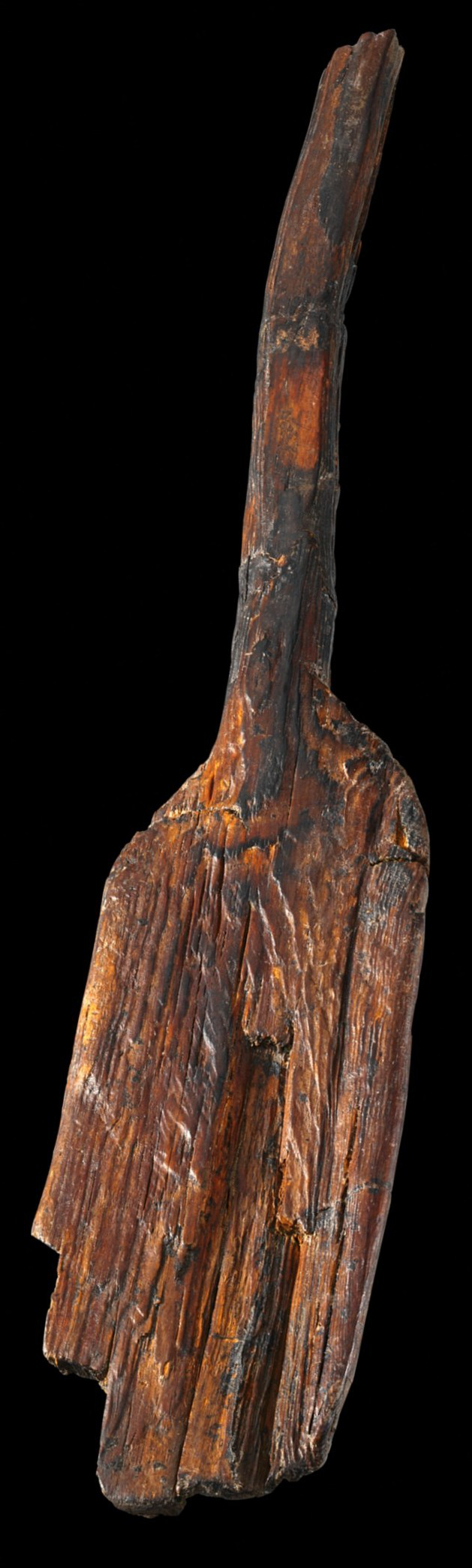
- Material: Pine wood
- Size: Length: 52 cm Width: 10 cm
- Created: c. 6400 BC
- Discovered: 1926; Duvensee, Schleswig-Holstein, Germany
- Present location: Archaeological Museum of Hamburg, Hamburg, Germany

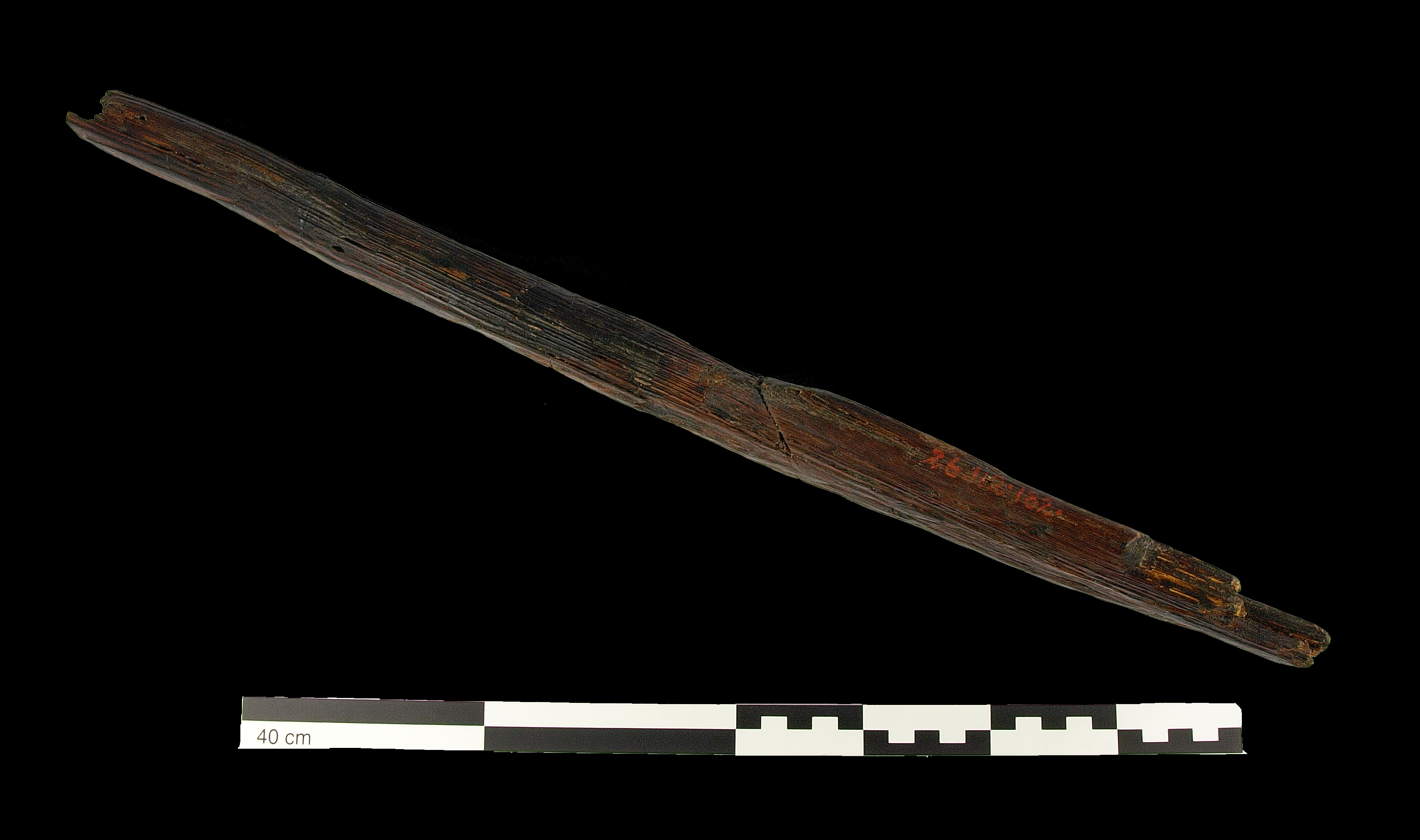
Lateral view with scale in centimetres

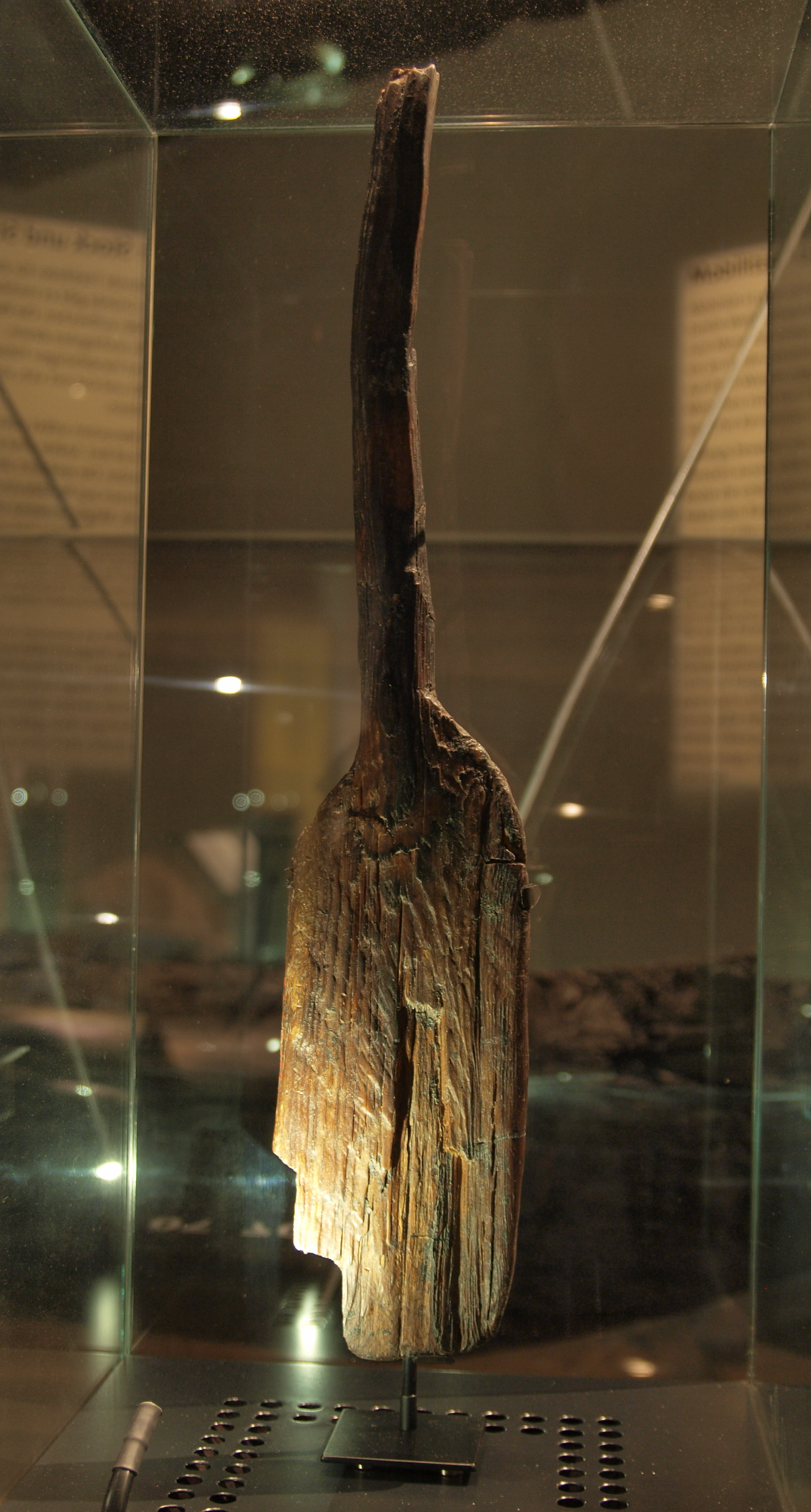
Duvensee paddle in the museum's show case

The Duvensee paddle is the preserved part of a Mesolithic spade paddle, which was found during archaeological excavations of a Mesolithic dwelling area in Duvensee, Schleswig-Holstein, Germany in 1926. After a paddle from Star Carr in England, the Duvensee paddle is the second oldest known paddle and is considered among the earliest evidence for the use of water transport in the Mesolithic. The find is in the permanent exhibition of the Archaeological Museum of Hamburg in Hamburg, Germany.

== Location of find ==
The former bog Duvenseer Moor was located west of the village Duvensee in a young drift landscape. The area, of 3.5 kilometres (2.2 mi) from north to south and 1.2 kilometres (0.75 mi) from east to west, originally was an open, shallow lake which gradually developed to a marsh. From the late 18th century, the marsh was drained by ditches to make usable for agriculture. The peat of the bog was cut for fuel. By the early 19th century only a small body of open water remained, which was eventually completely drained. In 1923 the geologist Karl Gripp discovered by chance a Mesolithic settlement site while mapping the Duvenseer Moor. In the following years, the site was archaeologically investigated. Archaeologists Gustav Schwantes (1924–1927), 1946 Hermann Schwabedissen (1946) and finally Klaus Bokelmann (1966–1967) excavated the bog and documented many dwelling places. Besides numerous stone artifacts, the excavations provided only very few wooden tools, including the paddle found by Schwantes in 1926, located in a former bank zone near a residential area. The Duvensee paddle, found at 53.699171°N 10.54739°E, is one of the most outstanding finds from the Duvenseer Moor.

== Findings ==
The paddle was found broken into several pieces, but except for a few flaws was extremely well preserved. The excellent preservation status of the paddle's wood was caused by a very low level of oxygen in the lake's humid sediments that quickly covered the paddle, which subsequently kept the growth of microorganisms to a minimum. Under normal oxygen conditions, fungi, bacteria, and insects would have caused a biological degradation of the wood in short time. Only the end of the handle is missing and a corner of the paddle's leaf (blade) is broken off. The paddle has a length of 52 centimetres (20 in), a width of 10 centimetres (3.9 in) and a thickness of 35 millimetres (1.4 in). The leaf has a long rectangular shape with widely rounded corners, having a length of about 260 millimetres (10 in) and an asymmetric connection to the shaft. The weight of the paddle is 331 grams (11.7 oz). The paddle was carved from the stem of a pine tree, with knots smoothed to the shaft. After recovery, the paddle was treated with an unknown waxy substance for conservation. In the 1920s, the paddle was typologically dated by palynological evidence to the Mesolithic period. Radiocarbon dating in the 1980s on several hazelnut shells and remaining wood from the find spot gave a more precise date of around 7390 ± 80 BC. An accelerator mass spectrometry (^{14} C-AMS) carried out in 2008 on two samples from the paddle yielded calibrated dates to 6527 ± 49 years BC and 6311 ± 38 years BC. Of note are the distinctly different ^{14}C-ages of samples from urban findings.

=== Other finds ===
Before 1925, elementary school teacher Ernst Bornhöf, from nearby Schiphorst, found two paddles which he incorporated in his school's prehistoric collection. Both paddles were transferred to the Helms-Museum in 1925. One is a large-leafed paddle of oak, 790×182×35 millimetres (31.1×7.2×1.4 in) with a weight of 613 grams (21.6 oz). It was ^{14}C-dated in 2008 to 1,121 ± 22 Before Present (around 829 AD ± 22 years), the period of transition from the early- to high Middle Ages. The second paddle is now lost, and only a few written records and a photo of the object exist. It was probably made from pine wood having an incised decoration on the shaft, which is not recognizable in the photo. Both paddles were recovered by Bornhöft without documenting any further detail of the archaeological context.

== Interpretation ==
The results of the excavation enabled a reassessment of Mesolithic cultures in Northern Germany. Schwantes coined the name Duvensee group for the cultural group that extends over Schleswig-Holstein, Mecklenburg and parts of Brandenburg. After the excavation Schwantes published the Duvensee paddle as the oldest paddle known worldwide and simultaneously as the oldest, even if only indirect, evidence for the use of boats in the Mesolithic, which was widely viewed. This view has been tempered by the discovery of an older paddle from Star Carr.

== Reception ==
The discovery of the Duvensee paddle aroused a huge interest in international archaeological communities, and the museum was asked for a copy of the paddle for the 1936 Summer Olympics. In the 1990s, the community of Duvensee thought about using the paddle in its new coat of arms, but after consultation with heralds, the idea was rejected. After the town won a Most Beautiful Village In 2005 competition, a bronze replica of the paddle was cast and erected in front of the village hall.

== Bibliography ==
- Bokelmann, Klaus (2012). "Spade paddling on a Mesolithic lake – Remarks on Preboreal and Boreal sites from Duvensee (Northern Germany)". In Niekus, M.J.L.Th.; Barton, R.N.E.; Street, M.; Terberger, Th. (eds.). A Mind Set on Flint: Studies in Honour of Dick Stapert. Elde: Barkhuis. pp. 369–380. doi:10.2307/j.ctt2272864.28. ISBN 978-94-91431-01-2.
- Holst, Daniela (2010). "Hazelnut economy of early Holocene hunteregatherers: a case study from Mesolithic Duvensee, northern Germany". Journal of Archaeological Science. 37 (11). Elsevier: 2871–2880. doi:10.1016/j.jas.2010.06.028.
- Jenke, Mareike. "Ausgrabungen im Duvenseer Moor, Kreis Herzogtum Lauenburg - Zur Rekonstruktion einer Altgrabung". Hammaburg N.F. (in German). 16: 9-78 (here 48-49). ISSN 0173-0886.

This article has been translated in part from the German Wikipedia equivalent.
