= Kurt Dinter =

German botanist

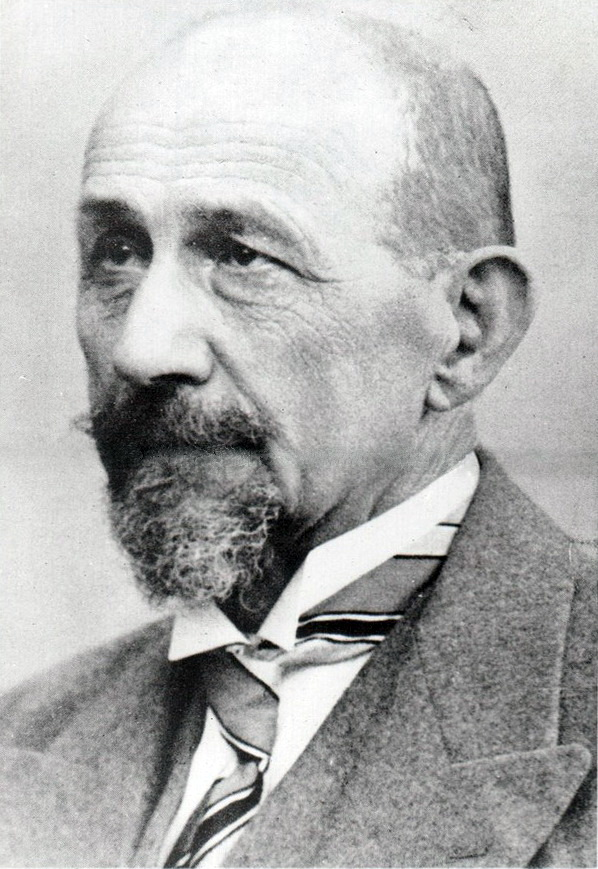
- Born: June 10, 1868
- Died: December 16, 1945 (aged 77)
- Scientific career
- Fields: Botany

Moritz Kurt Dinter (10 June 1868 – 16 December 1945) was a German botanist and explorer in South West Africa.

== Education and career ==
Dinter was born in Bautzen, where he attended the Realschule. After completing his military service he joined the Botanic Gardens at Dresden and Strasbourg to further his botanical and horticultural interests. He was appointed assistant to Prof. Carl Georg Oscar Drude, the plant geographer, in Dresden. As a result of his keen interest in exotic succulents, he was selected by Sir Thomas Hanbury to manage his acclimatisation garden, the Giardini Botanici Hanbury at La Mortola, near Ventimiglia on the Italian Riviera. This garden had a large collection of South African bulbs and succulents. After six months at Kew, he traveled to Swakopmund, southwest Africa, in June 1897, having sailed on the "Melitta Bohlem".

Dinter started his collection in the countryside around Swakopmund, moved on to Walvis Bay and Lüderitz where he was intrigued by the succulents growing between shoreline rocks. Since he was financially dependent on sales of his plant specimens, he travelled frequently and widely in the company of Herero natives. His collections were sent to Haage & Schmidt in Erfurt, as well as to Schinz in Zurich and Engler in Berlin. The German government at the time appointed him as botanist in the territory, a position he held until 1914 with the outbreak of World War I.

Dinter experimented with growing various species of exotics and indigenous trees - first at Brakwater near Windhoek and later at Okahandja - Cypresses, Eucalypts and Acacia erioloba. In the Herero Wars he lost most of his personal effects and about half of his plant collection. He visited Germany in 1905 and donated the remainder of his collection to Berlin-Dahlem. According to his Index, in 1900 he started a new set of numbers for his specimens.

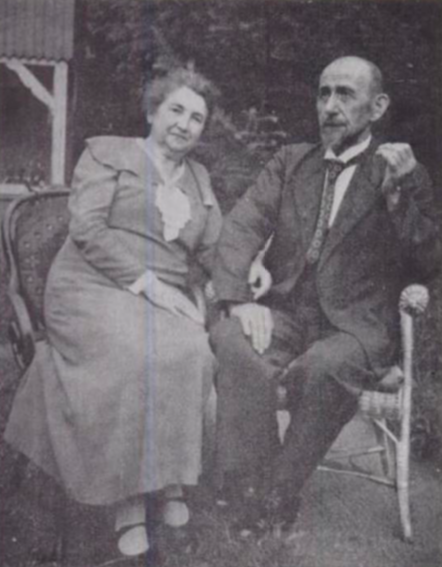
Kurt and Jutta Dinter

While in Bautzen he met Helena Jutta Schilde, who followed him to South West Africa and married him in Swakopmund on 16 May 1906, after which they settled in Okahandja; she turned out to be a tireless companion and colleague on his many expeditions. In 1907 he was visited by Galpin and Henry Pearson at Okahandja. Dinter visited the Lake Otjikoto in 1911 and collected several hitherto unknown species of plants, among them grass of the genus Rottboellia. He accompanied and guided Prof. Adolf Engler, the noted authority on African flora, on a rather fleeting trip through the region in 1913. Their trip started at Swakopmund and proceeded smoothly in a specially-commissioned railway carriage as far as Tsumeb and then south to Warmbad, covering about 2,000 kilometres (1,200 mi) in the space of a month.

Dinter returned to Germany in 1914 and was obliged to remain there until after the end of the war. South Africa had been given a mandate to administer the former Deutsch-Südwest-Afrika and Dinter applied to the authorities to be reinstated as the regional botanist. To this end he returned to Okahandja in 1922 and helped with the planning of Ernst Julius Rusch's succulent garden on the farm Lichtenstein. Dr. IB Pole Evans had discussions with the South West African government and as a result Dinter was given an ox-wagon, transport and labour expenses, and free rail travel. In return he would prepare four sets of specimens at a fixed price per sheet, one for himself and the other three to various herbaria.

In 1924 he was awarded an honorary professorship by the German government together with a modest pension. This enabled him to return to Germany in 1925. He made two further visits to South West Africa, from 1928 to 1929 when he collected in the coastal desert area, and again from 1933 to 1935 when he travelled north from Grootfontein to the Okavango River and in the South from Aus to Sendelingsdrift on the Orange River. He died in Neukirch/Lausitz, aged 77.

== Legacy ==
Dinter and his wife Jutta are commemorated in the genera Dintera Stapf, Dinteracanthus C.B.Cl. ex Schinz, Dinteranthus Schwantes, and Juttadinteria Schwantes. As well as a great number of specific names including Amaranthus dinteri Schinz, Anacampseros dinter Schinz, Cissus juttae Dinter, Hoodia juttae Dinter, Stapelia dinteri Berger, Stapelia juttae Dinter, Trichocaulon dinteri Berger and Vigna dinteri Harms. The botanical journal Dinteria was named in his honour to celebrate the centenary of his birth.

Dinter covered an estimated 40,000 km on foot, by wagon and motor vehicle during the course of his collecting trips, which spanned 38 years, in South West Africa. His collection of pressed specimens numbered in excess of 8400. Large quantities of living plants and seeds, and his wife's collections, were never numbered.

== Publications ==
- Alphabetical Catalogue of Plants Growing in the Garden La Mortola (1897)
- Deutsch-Südwest-Afrika: Flora, forst- und landwirtschaftliche Fragmenta (Leipzig 1909)
- Die vegetabilische Veldkost Deutsch-Südwest-Afrikas (Okahandja 1914)
