= Martin Heinrich Gustav Schwantes =

German botanist (1881–1960)

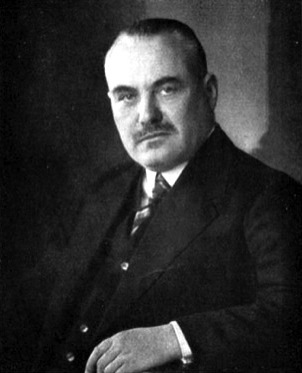
- Born: 18 September 1881; Bleckede
- Died: 17 November 1960 (aged 79); Hamburg
- Known for: Studies on Aizoaceae (Mesembryanthemaceae), Discovering the Duvensee paddle
- Spouse: Astrid Schwantes
- Scientific career
- Fields: Archaeology, Botany
- Author abbrev. (botany): Schwantes

Martin Heinrich Gustav Schwantes (18 September 1881 – 17 November 1960) was a German archaeologist and botanist specialist of Aizoaceae (Mesembryanthemaceae).

== Life and work ==
Schwantes was born in Bleckede and died in Hamburg.

The Duvensee paddle is the preserved part of a Mesolithic spade paddle, which was found during archaeological excavations of a Mesolithic dwelling area at Duvensee near Klinkrade (Herzogtum Lauenburg) Schleswig-Holstein, Germany, in 1926 by Schwantes.

== Publications ==
- Deutschlands Urgeschichte (1908)
- "Die Gräber der ältesten Eisenzeit im östlichen Hannover", in: Prähistorische Zeitschrift, vol. 1 (1909), p. 140-162
- Die Bedeutung der Lyngby-Zivilisation für die Gliederung der Steinzeit (Hamburg, 1923)
- Führer durch Haithabu (1932)
- Zur Geschichte der nordischen Zivilisation (Hamburg: Evert, 1938)
- Die Geschichte Schleswig-Holsteins, vol. 1, Vorgeschichte Schleswig-Holsteins (1939)
- Geschichte Schleswig-Holsteins. Die Urgeschichte, vol. 1, part 1 (Neumünster, 1958)
- The Cultivation of the Mesembryanthemaceae (1953)
- Flowering Stones and Mid-Day Flowers (1957)

== Tributes ==
The genus name Schwantesia is in honour of Gustav Schwantes. Astridia is a genus of plant named after Schwantes' wife, Astrid. Lithops schwantesii is a species name given as another tribute.
