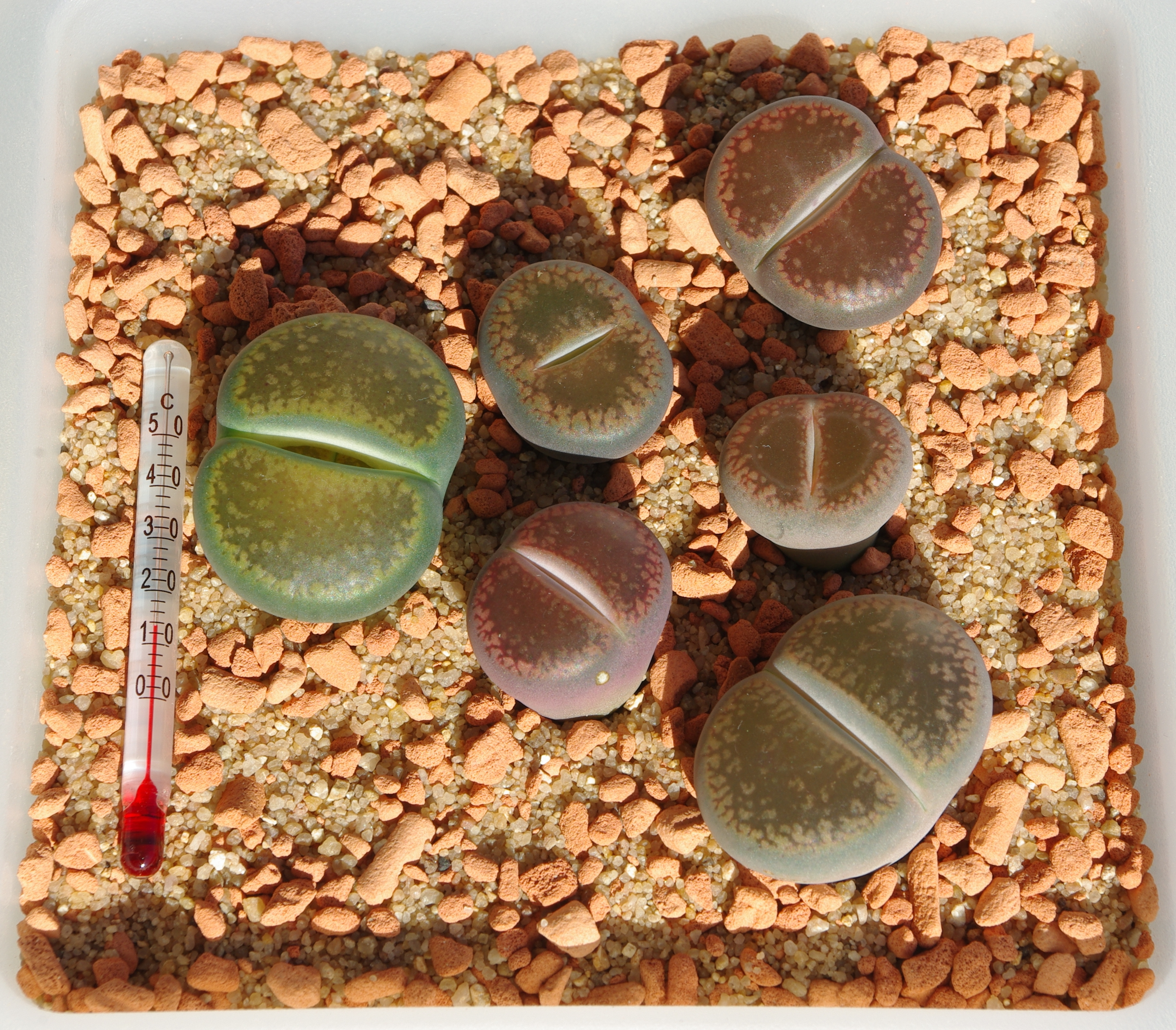

Scientific classification
- Kingdom: Plantae
- Clade: Tracheophytes
- Clade: Angiosperms
- Clade: Eudicots
- Order: Caryophyllales
- Family: Aizoaceae
- Genus: Lithops
- Species: L. aucampiae

Binomial name
- Lithops aucampiae L.Bolus

Synonyms
- Lithops aucampiae var. koelemanii (de Boer) D.T.Cole; Lithops koelemanii de Boer; Lithops turbiniformis (Haw.) N.E.Br. Mesembryanthemum turbiniforme Haw.

= Lithops aucampiae =

Species of succulent flowering plant

Lithops aucampiae is a species of flowering plant in the family Aizoaceae, found in South Africa. it was named after Juanita Aucamp, who found a specimen on her father's farm in Postmasburg, Northern Cape in 1929.

== Habitat ==
This desert plant is found in areas of ironstone, with sandstone, chert and quartzite in Transvaal, South Africa. This is an area with summer rainfall.

== Appearance ==
Although variable in appearance, it nevertheless conforms to the typical Lithops morphology: two thick, fleshy leaves (each with a large leaf window to allow light into the underground part of the plant), separated by a crack from which a yellow flower appears. In the variety koelemanii the window and the groove are reduced.

== Cultivation ==
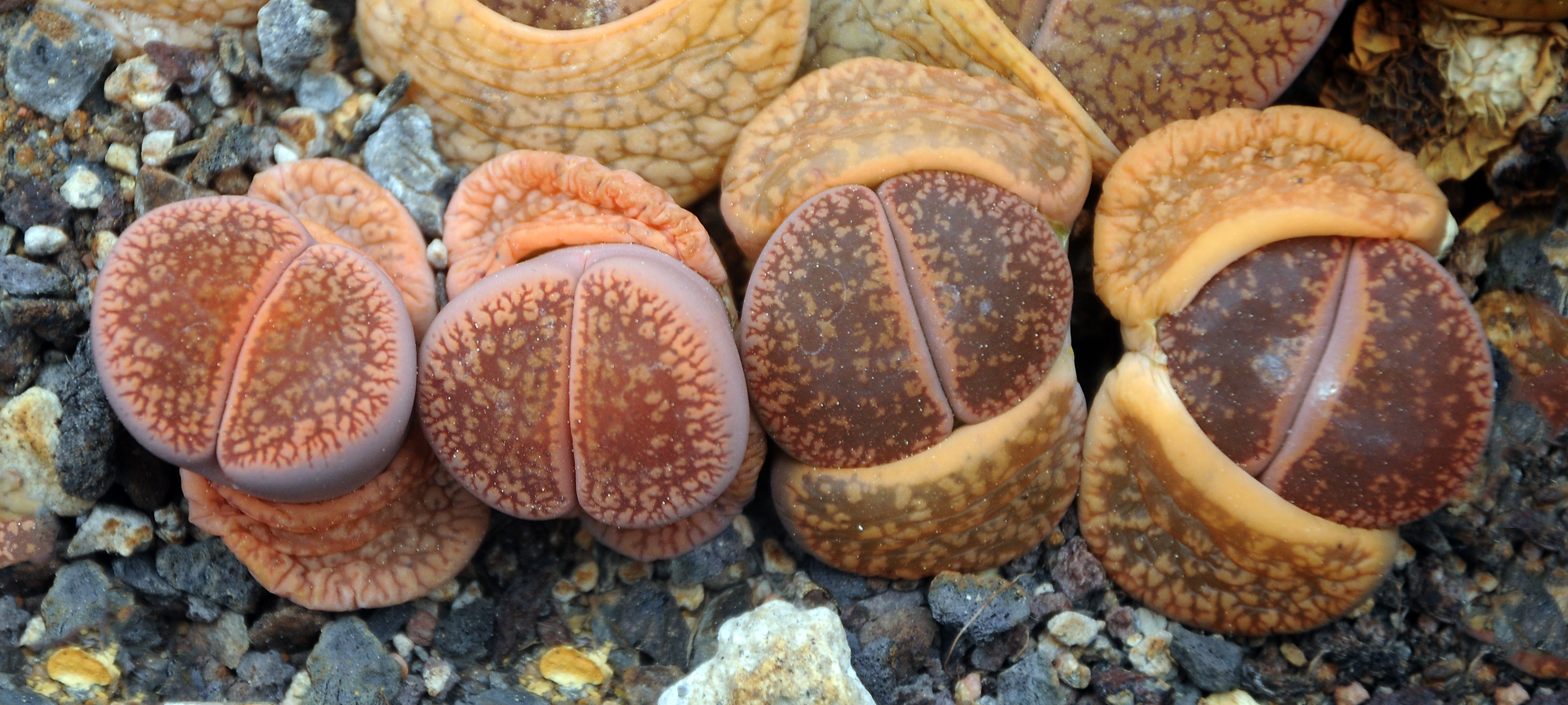
New leaf-pairs emerging to replace the old

It is commonly used as a houseplant or for landscaping. Like all Lithops, it requires extremely well-drained soil.

Like all Lithops it also grows in annual cycles, as the leaf-pairs flower, and then each produces a new leaf-pair that replaces the old one (which shrivels away). The principal rule of watering is that Lithops should be kept dry from when they finish flowering, up until the old leaf-pairs are fully replaced.

Of the Lithops species, L. aucampiae is one of the species which is most tolerant of occasional incorrect watering, and therefore among the easiest to cultivate (together with L. lesliei, L. hookeri and L. salicola).

This plant has won the Royal Horticultural Society's Award of Garden Merit.
