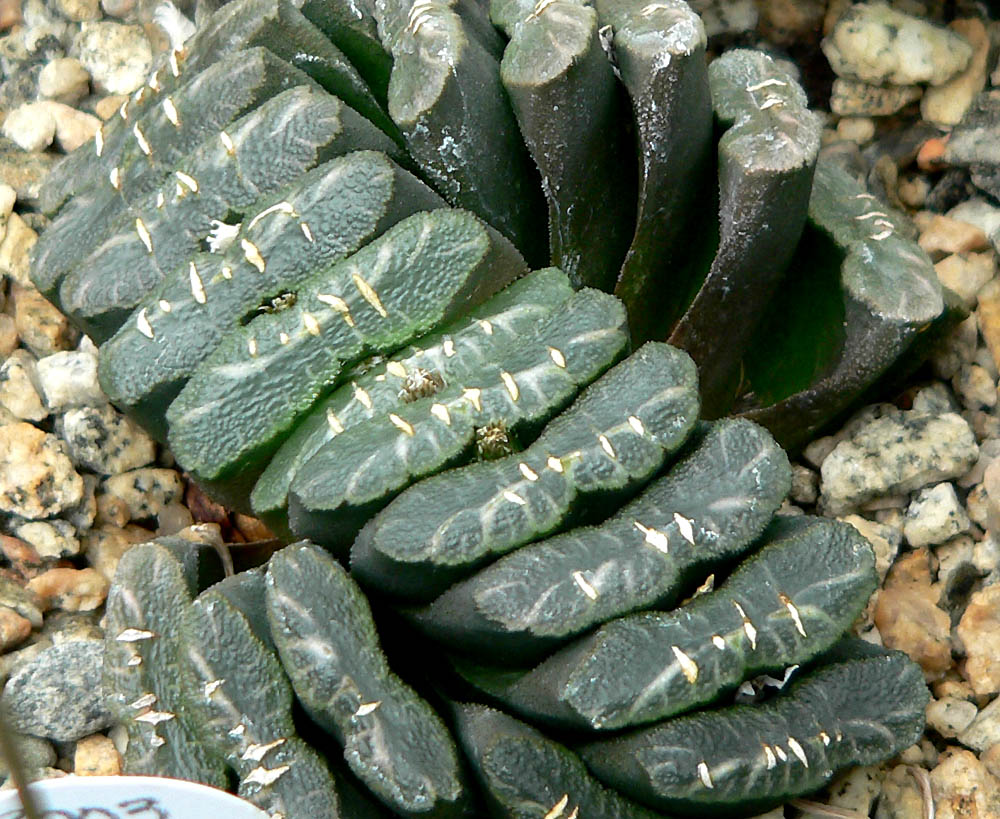

Scientific classification
- Kingdom: Plantae
- Clade: Tracheophytes
- Clade: Angiosperms
- Clade: Monocots
- Order: Asparagales
- Family: Asphodelaceae
- Subfamily: Asphodeloideae
- Genus: Haworthia
- Species: H. truncata

Binomial name
- Haworthia truncata Schönland

= Haworthia truncata =

Species of succulent

Haworthia truncata, locally known as horse's teeth, is a species of succulent plant in the genus Haworthia. It is found in the Little Karoo region, in the far east of the Western Cape Province, South Africa.

== Description ==
It is a small plant, being approximately 2 cm (0.79 in) high by 10 cm (3.9 in) wide. This species is easily recognizable by its leaves which have a nearly rectangular crosssection and are arranged in two opposite rows. The leaves are grey or grey-green and are held more or less upright. The end of a leaf – the upper surface – gives the impression of having been cut (or truncated), hence the specific epithet truncata. The leaves are covered in white or grey lines with verrucosities.

In the wild, plants are often half-buried, leaving only the tips of the leaves visible above the soil. The truncated tip has a leaf window; i.e. it is translucent, allowing light to enter for photosynthesis. In this respect the species resembles Lithops, Fenestraria, and Haworthia cymbiformis.

The flowers are not very showy, emerging in white, tubular clusters on a 20 cm (7.9 in) stem.

== Varieties and cultivars ==
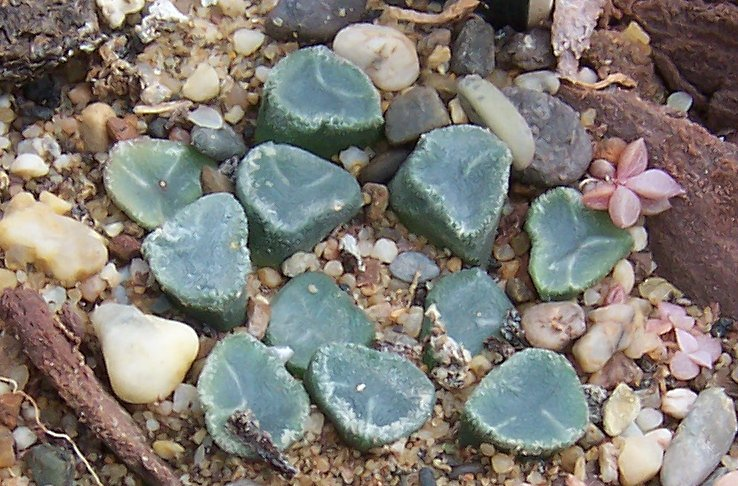
Haworthia truncata var. maughanii

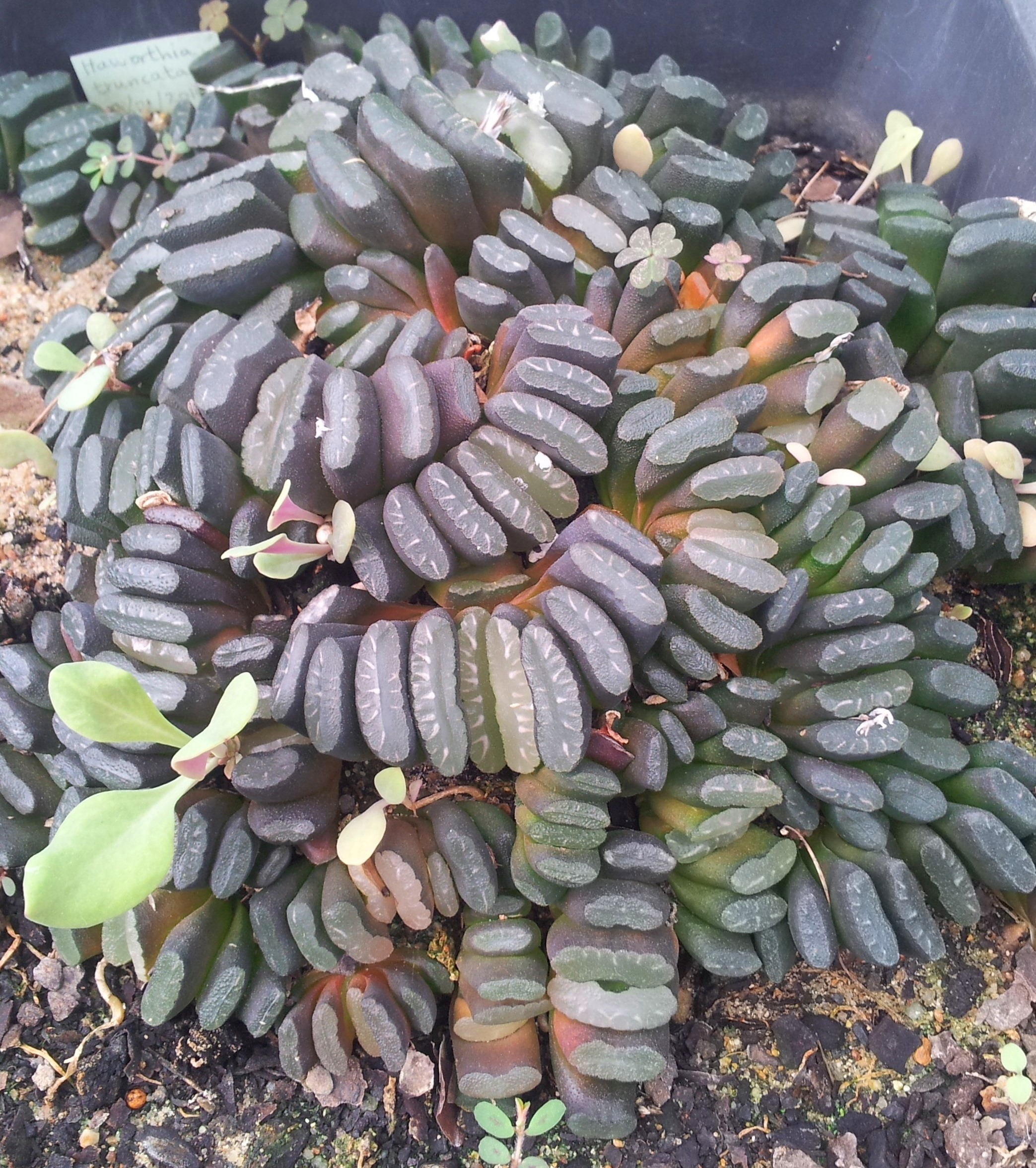
A large colony of the plants growing in cultivation

=== Varieties ===
Haworthia truncata var. maughanii (Poelln.) B.Fearn

The naturally occurring variety maughanii has rounded leaves that grow in a spiral rosette (not in a distichous row, as in the more common type variety) and can be found in a small restricted area near Calitzdorp. This is to the far west of the natural range of the Haworthia truncata, and there are natural intermediates and hybrids on the boundary between the varieties.

Haworthia truncata var. truncata

The type variety of the species, under which the forms "minor" and "crassa" fall. "H. truncata f. minor" and "H. truncata f. crassa" are now classified as synonyms of H. truncata var. truncata by WCSP.
Form "minor" (lit. "smaller") is miniature, forming the typical distichous leaf-rows with tiny hairs on the leaf tips. It is restricted to a small area near Dysseldorp. This form is also sometimes referred to as Haworthia papillaris Breuer.
Form "tenuis" has a fan of window-tipped leaves each only 12 mm (0.47 in) long with window-tips only 4 mm (0.16 in) wide.
Form "crassa" (lit. "fat") is an intermediate form between the variety maughanii and the type variety truncata. It has the rounded leaf tips of var. maughanii, but unlike that variety they are arranged in distichous rows.

=== Cultivars ===
In cultivation, a wide variety of cultivars have been produced, through selective breeding of varieties and through hybridisation.

- Haworthia truncata 'Lime Green': the netting of veins is lime green in colour. A hybrid between H. truncata and H. cuspidata (or perhaps H. cymbiformis).

== Cultivation ==
This species is increasingly common in cultivation and is very easy to propagate in large numbers. It can be grown from seed, from off-sets, from root cuttings and even from leaf-cuttings. It also readily hybridises with other Haworthia species.

It requires very well-drained soil, and some exposure to sun. It is also one of the few Haworthia species that can become adapted to a full sun environment. Its natural habitat in the Little Karoo is arid, but with sparse rainfall intermittently throughout the year. In the gentle (often semi-shade) conditions in cultivation, the leaves tend to grow upwards and outside of the soil.

In temperate regions, H. truncata is usually grown under glass or indoors, as it does not tolerate freezing temperatures. In cultivation in the UK it has gained the Royal Horticultural Society's Award of Garden Merit.
