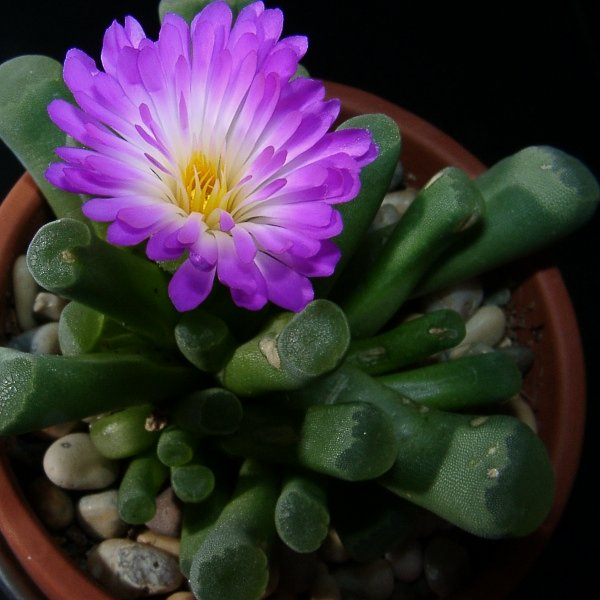
- Frithia pulchra

Scientific classification
- Kingdom: Plantae
- Clade: Tracheophytes
- Clade: Angiosperms
- Clade: Eudicots
- Order: Caryophyllales
- Family: Aizoaceae
- Subfamily: Ruschioideae
- Tribe: Ruschieae
- Genus: Frithia; N.E.Br.

= Frithia =

Genus of succulents

Frithia is a genus of succulent plants in the family Aizoaceae, indigenous to several small rocky areas in the vicinity of Gauteng Province, South Africa.

== Description ==
Like several of its close relatives (e.g. Fenestraria) and other plants in its ecotype (e.g. some species of Haworthia and Bulbine) it has epidermal windows (translucent areas in its leaves) as an adaptation to the difficulties of photosynthesis in its arid environment.

== Cultivation ==
Frithia are summer-growing species, as their natural habitat lies in a summer-rainfall region. They grow in very well-drained, sandy soil, with repetitive light watering in summer and a dry environment in winter.

== Species ==
The genus contains the following species:

- Frithia pulchra N.E.Br.
- Frithia humilis Burgoyne
