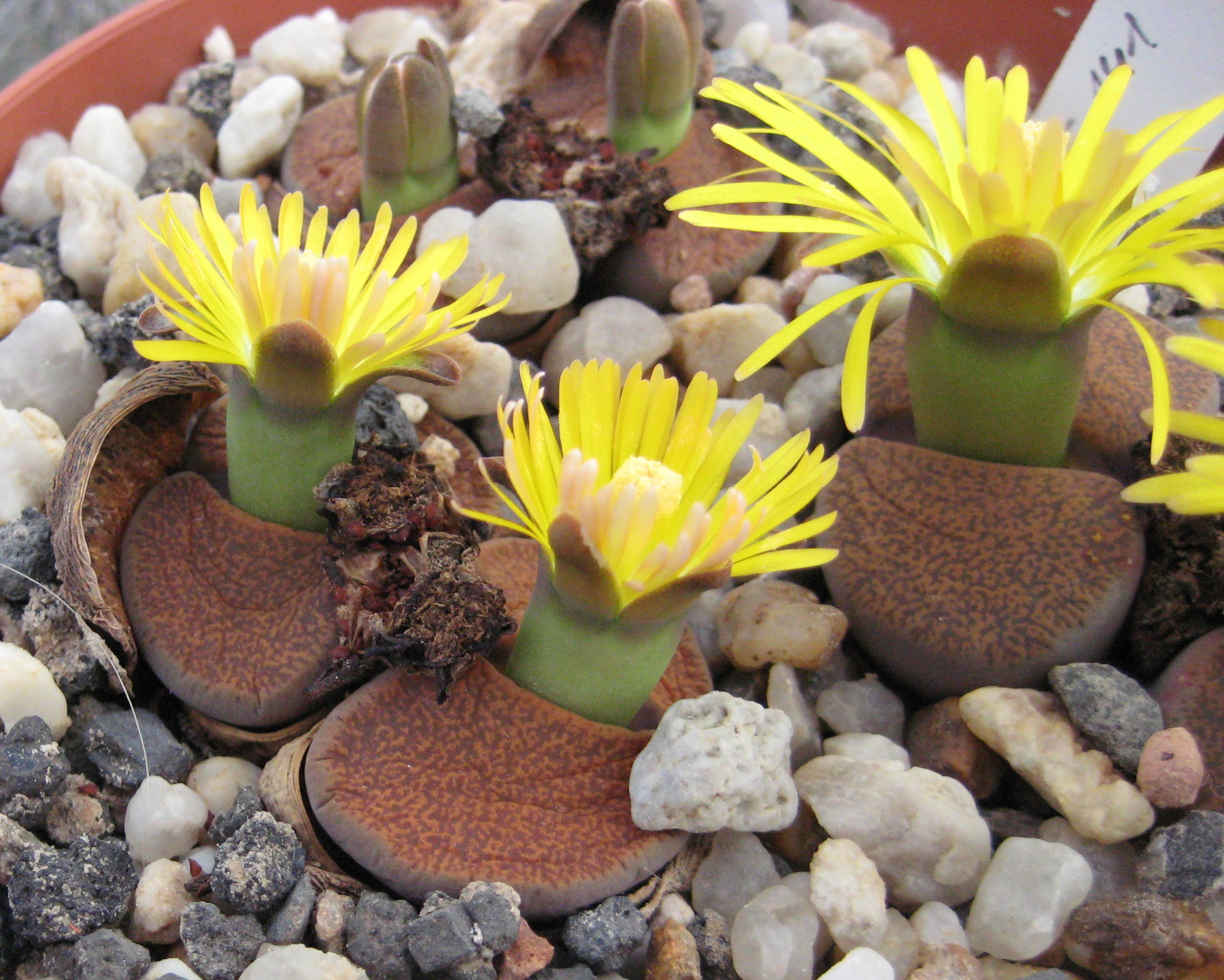

Scientific classification
- Kingdom: Plantae
- Clade: Tracheophytes
- Clade: Angiosperms
- Clade: Eudicots
- Order: Caryophyllales
- Family: Aizoaceae
- Genus: Lithops
- Species: L. lesliei

Binomial name
- Lithops lesliei (N.E.Br.) N.E.Br.

= Lithops lesliei =

Species of succulent plant

Lithops lesliei is a species of plant in the family Aizoaceae. The plant is collected for its medicinal properties, and has therefore become threatened.

== Description ==
Lithops lesliei is found in rocky areas of grasslands and savannah where it grows in the shade of another plant.

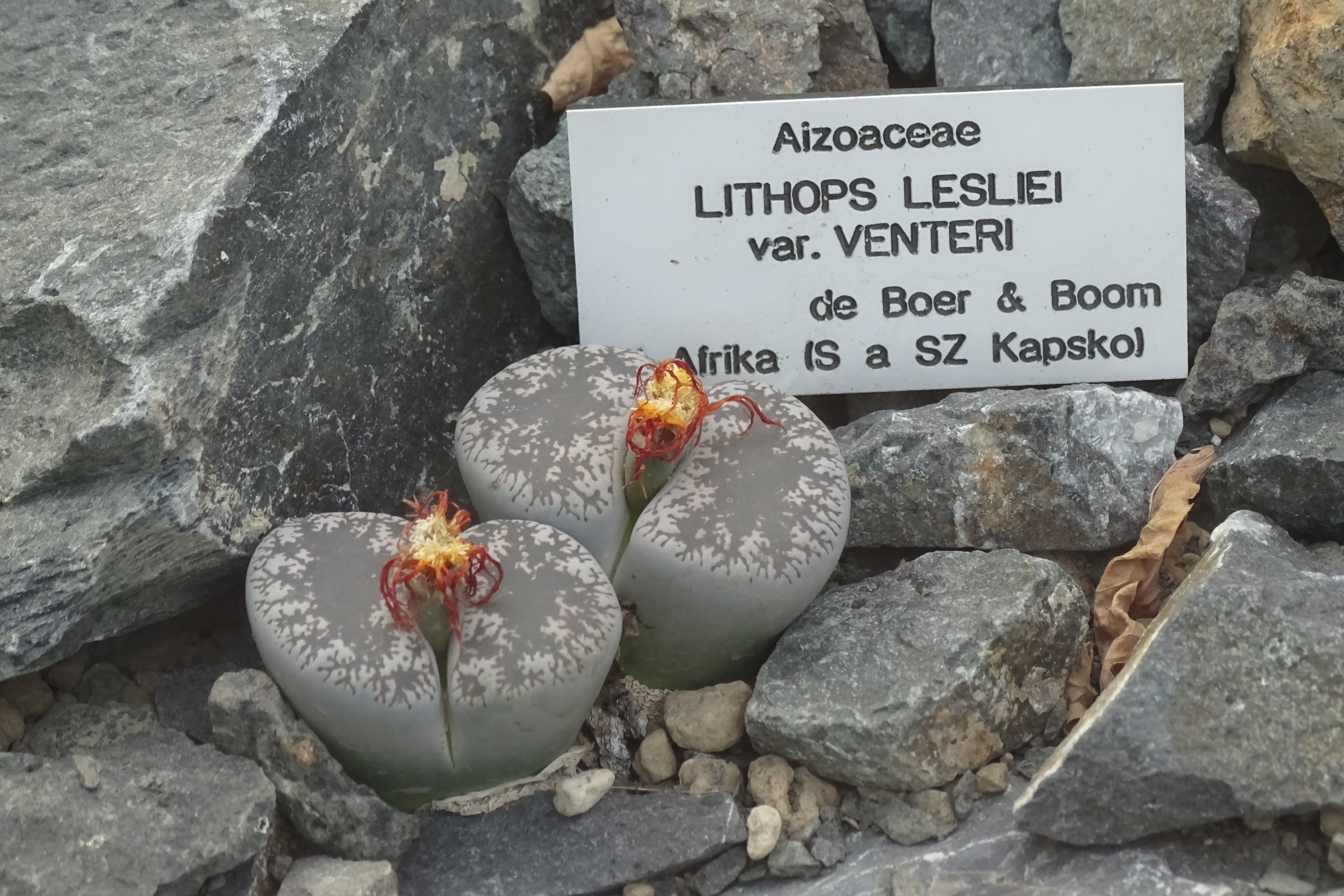
Lithops lesliei var. venteri v Botanické zahradě v Praze

== Distribution ==
This species can be found in the summer-rainfall areas of South Africa although it is not endemic. The plants have recently seen a 15% cut in numbers with predictions that this trend will continue. The plants are being taken to sell in markets for medicinal reasons. The plant continues to be seen in many places but a loss of habitat and predation in urban areas places this as a threatened species in South Africa.

== Cultivation ==
It is commonly used as a houseplant or for landscaping. Like all Lithops, it requires extremely well-drained soil. Like all Lithops it also grows in annual cycles, as the leaf-pairs flower, and then each produces a new leaf-pair that replaces the old one (which shrivels away). The principal rule of watering is that Lithops should be kept dry from when they finish flowering, up until the old leaf-pairs are fully replaced.

Of the Lithops species, L. lesliei is one of the species which is most tolerant of occasional incorrect watering, and therefore among the easiest to cultivate (together with L. salicola, L. hookeri and L. aucampiae). This plant is a recipient of the Royal Horticultural Society's Award of Garden Merit.
