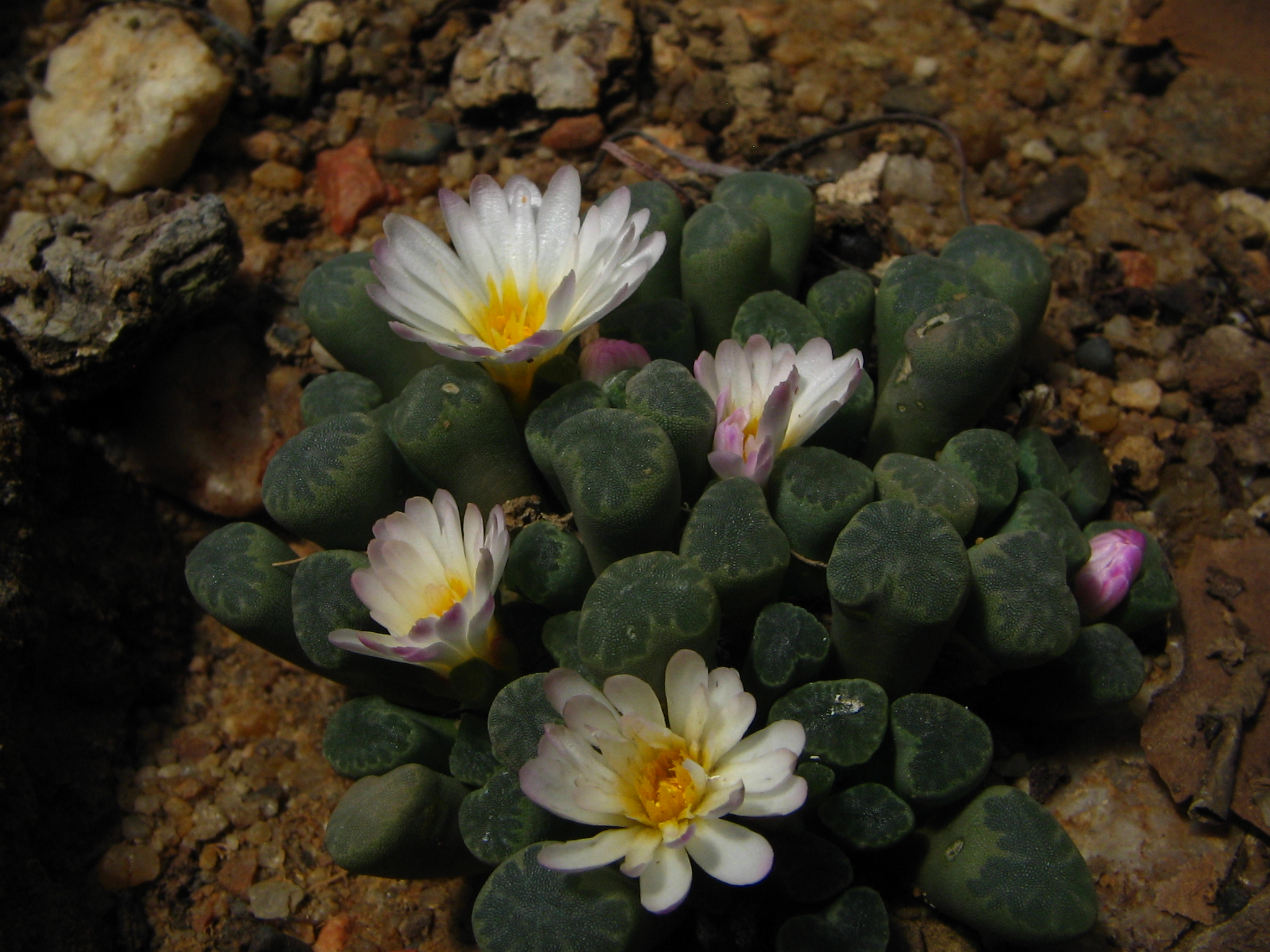

Scientific classification
- Kingdom: Plantae
- Clade: Tracheophytes
- Clade: Angiosperms
- Clade: Eudicots
- Order: Caryophyllales
- Family: Aizoaceae
- Genus: Frithia
- Species: F. humilis

Binomial name
- Frithia humilis Burgoyne (2000)

= Frithia humilis =

Species of succulent

Frithia humilis is a species of plant in the family Aizoaceae. It is one of the few members of Aizoaceae growing endemic to the summer-rainfall region of South Africa. It is restricted to two provinces of South Africa: Gauteng and Mpumalanga. This small plant consists of a cluster of long, succulent leaves that stick out just above the sandy gravel, with a thickened underground rootstock. The leaves lose water and contract during drought, hiding underground and so preventing more water loss.
