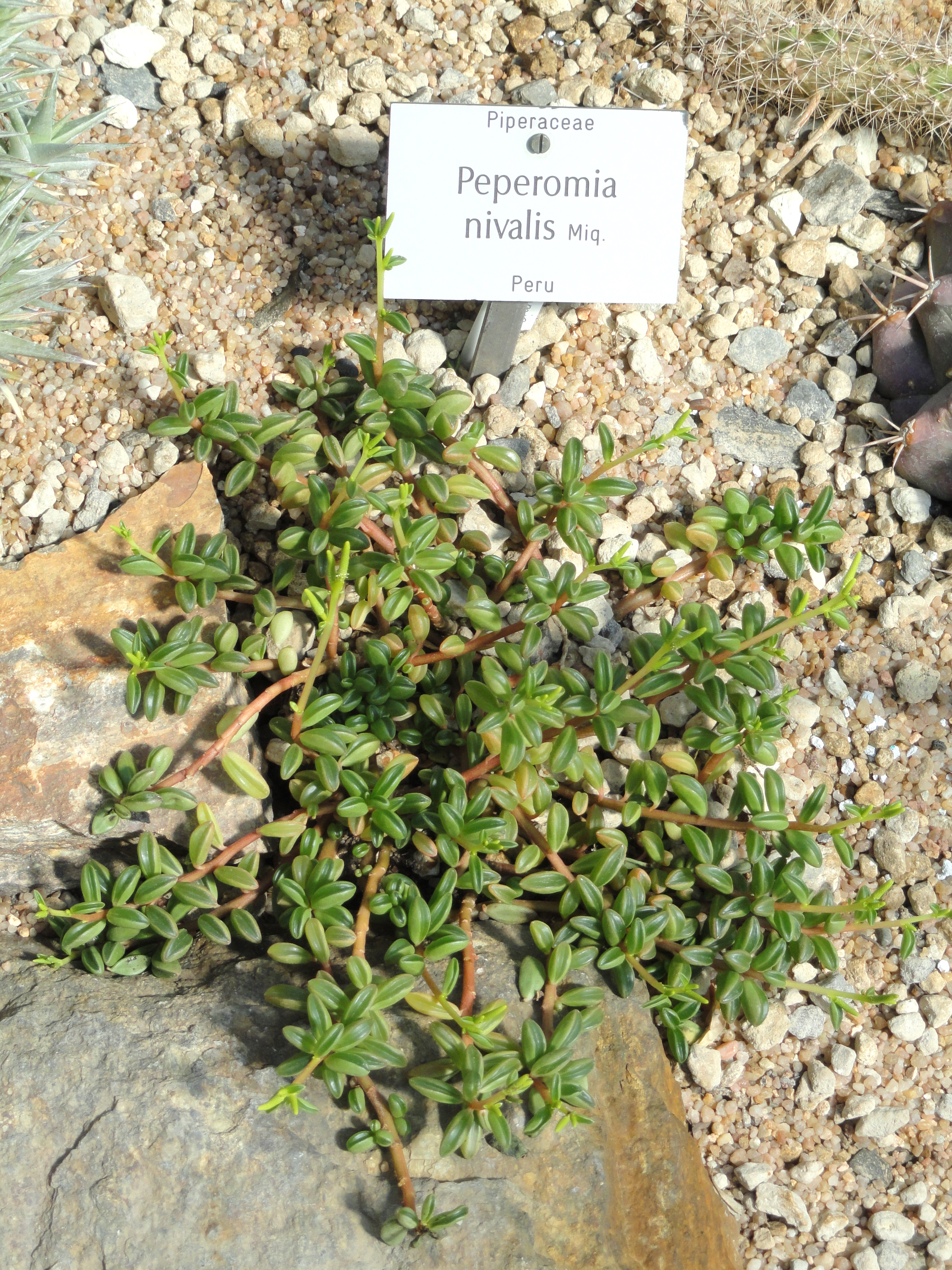

Scientific classification
- Kingdom: Plantae
- Clade: Tracheophytes
- Clade: Angiosperms
- Clade: Magnoliids
- Order: Piperales
- Family: Piperaceae
- Genus: Peperomia
- Species: P. nivalis

Binomial name
- Peperomia nivalis Miq.

= Peperomia nivalis =

Species of plant

Peperomia nivalis is a species of plant in the genus Peperomia endemic to Peru. Its native habitat is found in the high altitude ranges of the peruvian Andes. P. nivalis is a compact erect succulent herb with fleshy stems and leaves. The thick leaves are cuneate and U-shaped in cross-section with epidermal windows on the top-side. The leaf color is bright green in the shady summer and reddish during dry sunny seasons.

In addition to the basic P. nivalis four other varieties and forms are known: Peperomia nivalis f. diminuta, Peperomia nivalis var. compacta, Peperomia nivalis var. lepadiphylla (a.k.a. Peperomia pruinosifolia), and Peperomia nivalis var. sanmarcensis. They all share basic characteristics, such as the windowed leaves, but there also clear differences. For example, the variety P. nivalis lepadiphylla features trailing rather than erect stems and shorter leaves which resemble peas or lentils.

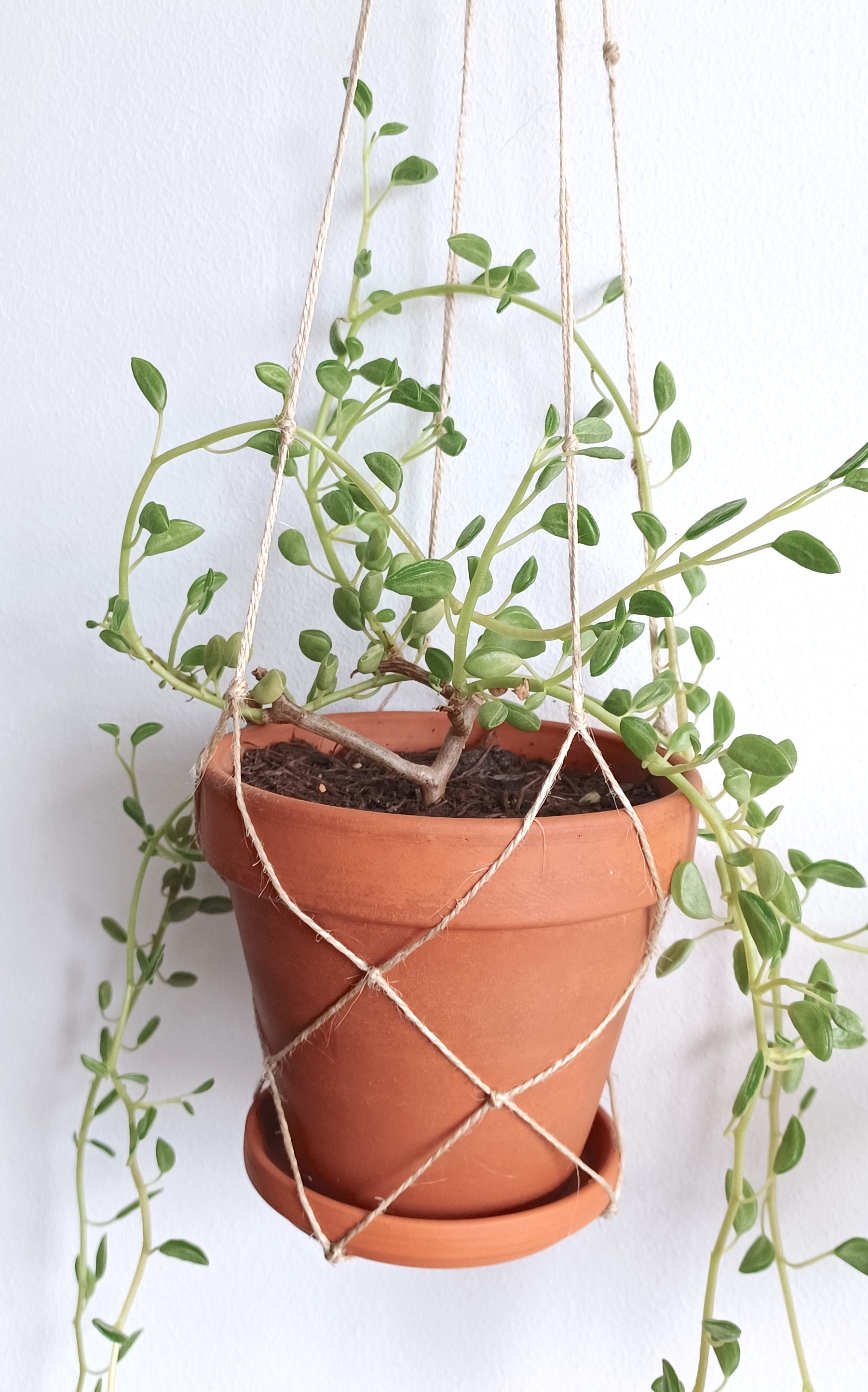
Peperomia nivalis var. lepadiphylla as a houseplant.

Varieties of Peperomia nivalis are sometimes kept as ornamental plants, especially by succulent plant collectors. Due to their fleshy leaves and stems they are drought-tolerant and can survive weeks without water. Overwatering can be highly detrimental. They should always be watered moderately and be left without any water when temperatures are low.

P. nivalis and P. nivalis var. lepadiphylla are also used in peruvian folk medicine. The thick leaves are crushed leaving a sap which, after roasting, is used as drops against otitis and conjunctivitis.
