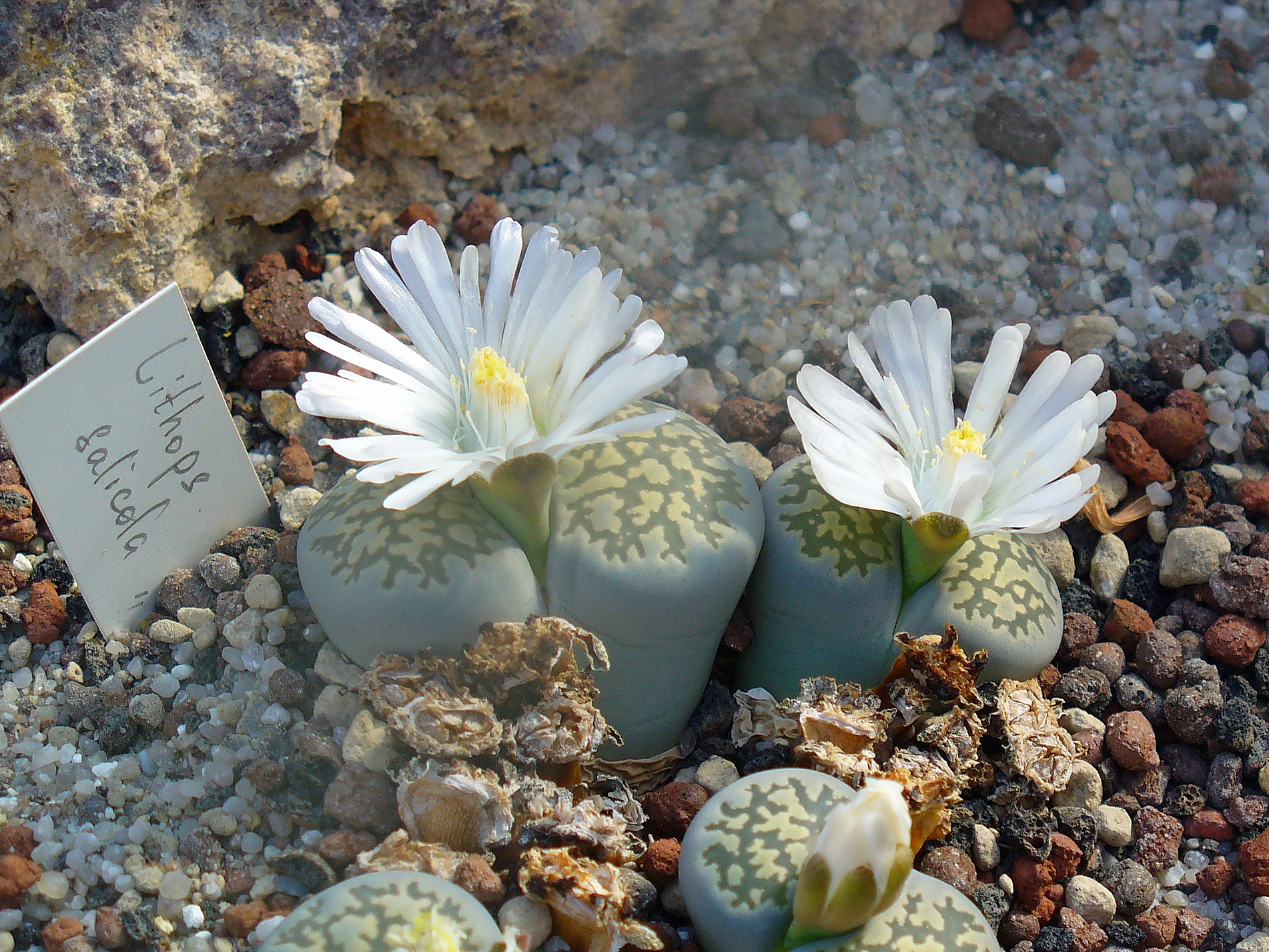

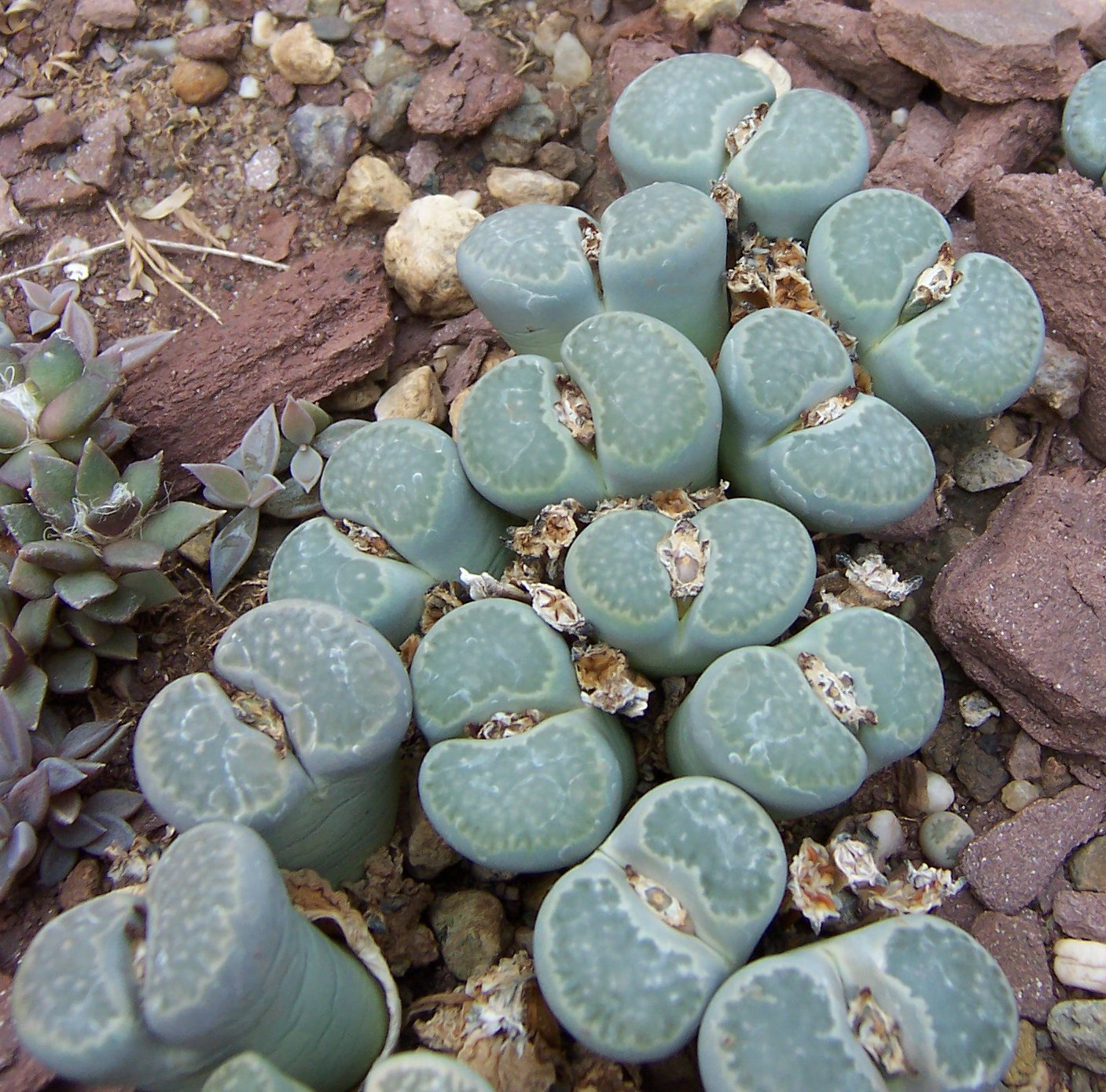

Scientific classification
- Kingdom: Plantae
- Clade: Embryophytes
- Clade: Tracheophytes
- Clade: Spermatophytes
- Clade: Angiosperms
- Clade: Eudicots
- Order: Caryophyllales
- Family: Aizoaceae
- Genus: Lithops
- Species: L. salicola

Binomial name
- Lithops salicola L.Bolus 1936

= Lithops salicola =

Species of succulent

Lithops salicola is a species of perennial plant in the family Aizoaceae, often called living stones, because of its resemblance to round grey pebbles.

== Description ==
Lithops salicola has two coupled leaves, divided by a fissure through which the flowers appear. It is cylindrical or conical with a flat surface and green-gray coloration. The flowers are white and very small. It grows to a height of 2 cm (0.79 in).

== Distribution ==
This species can be found in the Cape Provinces and Free State of South Africa at an elevation of 1,000 metres (3,300 ft) to 1,350 metres (4,430 ft). It is generally found in well-drained soil or in rock crevices. It occurs in an area of summer rainfall.

== Cultivation ==
L. salicola is commonly used as a houseplant or for landscaping. Like all Lithops species, it requires extremely well-drained soil. It also grows in annual cycles, as the leaf-pairs flower, and then each produces a new leaf-pair that replaces the old one (which shrivels away). The principal rule of watering is that plants should be kept dry from when they finish flowering, up until the old leaf-pairs are fully replaced.

Of the Lithops species, L. salicola is one of the species which is most tolerant of occasional incorrect watering, and therefore among the easiest to cultivate (together with L. lesliei, L. hookeri and L. aucampiae).

In the United Kingdom L. salicola has gained the Royal Horticultural Society's Award of Garden Merit.
