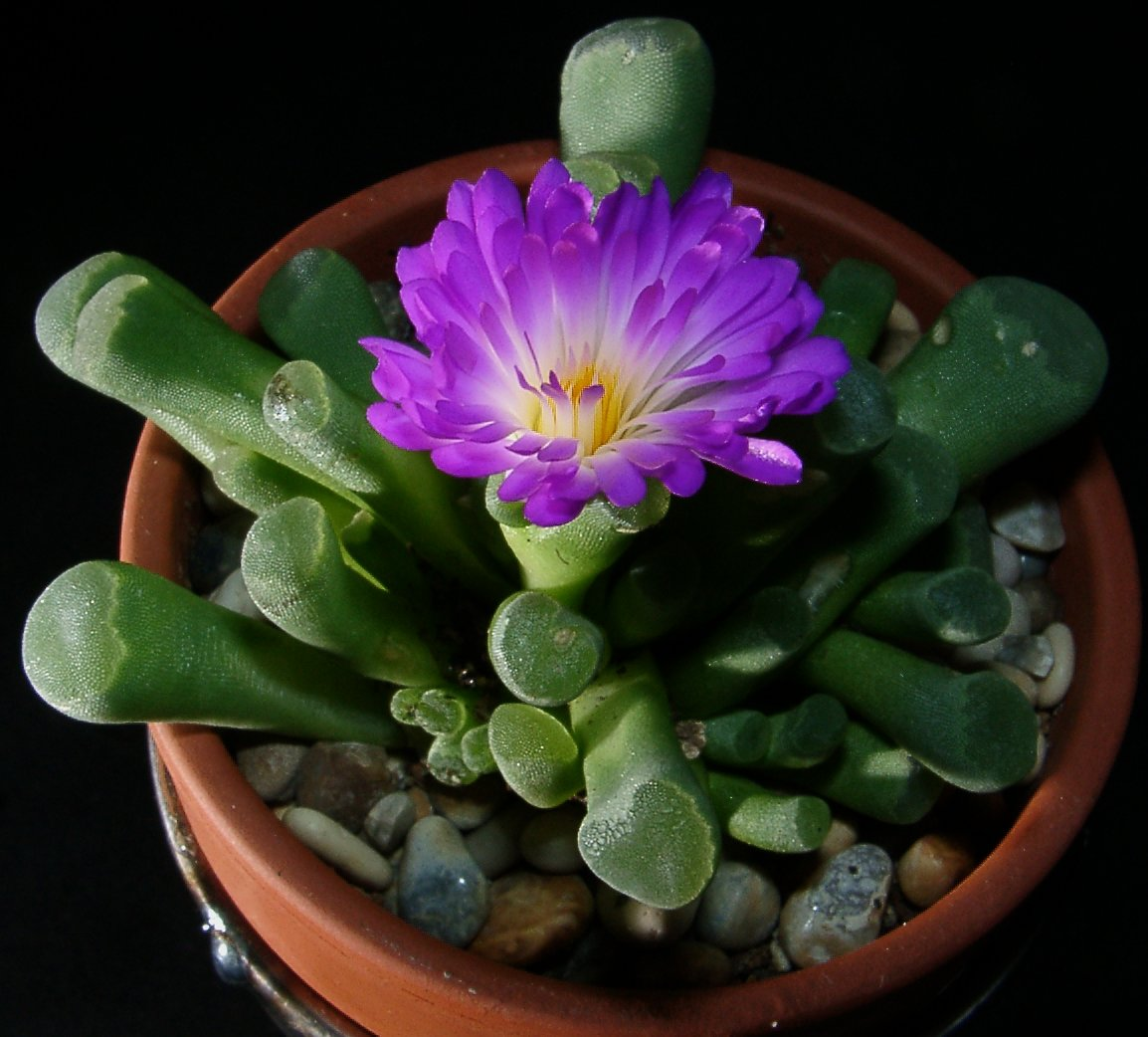

Conservation status
- Vulnerable (IUCN 3.1)

Scientific classification
- Kingdom: Plantae
- Clade: Tracheophytes
- Clade: Angiosperms
- Clade: Eudicots
- Order: Caryophyllales
- Family: Aizoaceae
- Genus: Frithia
- Species: F. pulchra

Binomial name
- Frithia pulchra N.E.Br.

= Frithia pulchra =

Species of succulent

Frithia pulchra, the fairy elephant's feet, is a species of flowering plant in the fig‑marigold family Aizoaceae, endemic to Gauteng Province, South Africa (where it is classified as "Vulnerable" by the IUCN Red List). Its natural habitat is temperate grassland with high summer rainfall. A tiny stemless succulent growing to just 10 cm (3.9 in) tall and 20 cm (7.9 in) broad, it has bulbous oblong leaves with leaf windows at the tip; and magenta and white daisy-like flowers in summer. During periods of drought it has the ability to shrink beneath the soil surface, thus avoiding excessive desiccation, but making it extremely difficult to find.

It is named for Frank Frith, a Johannesburg gardener who showed specimens to N.E. Brown, a botanist at Kew Gardens, while on a visit to London, UK, in 1925. The Latin specific epithet pulchra means "beautiful".

It does not survive frosts, so in temperate areas it needs to be cultivated under glass. In the UK it has gained the Royal Horticultural Society's Award of Garden Merit.

== Gallery ==
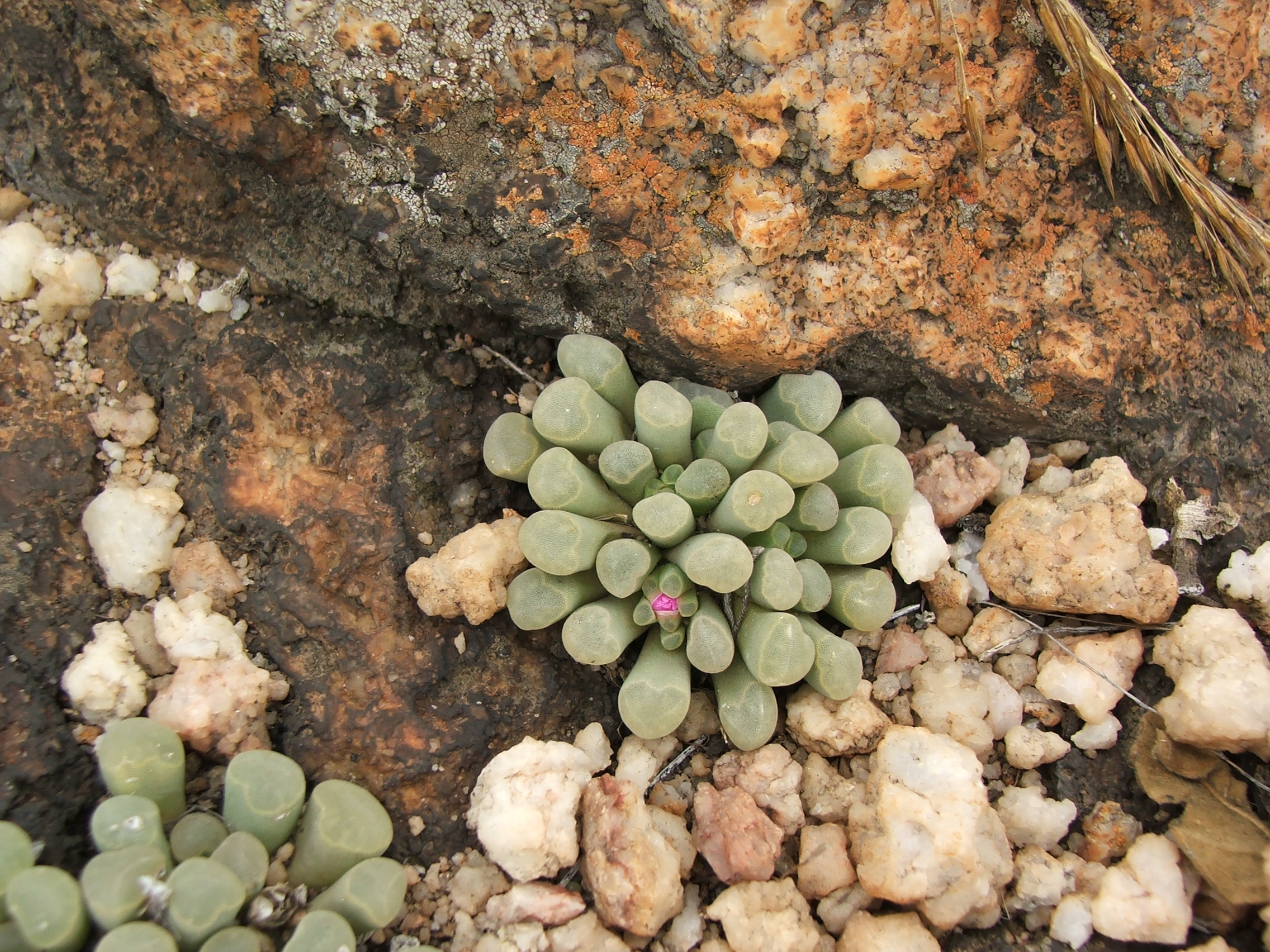
Wild plant

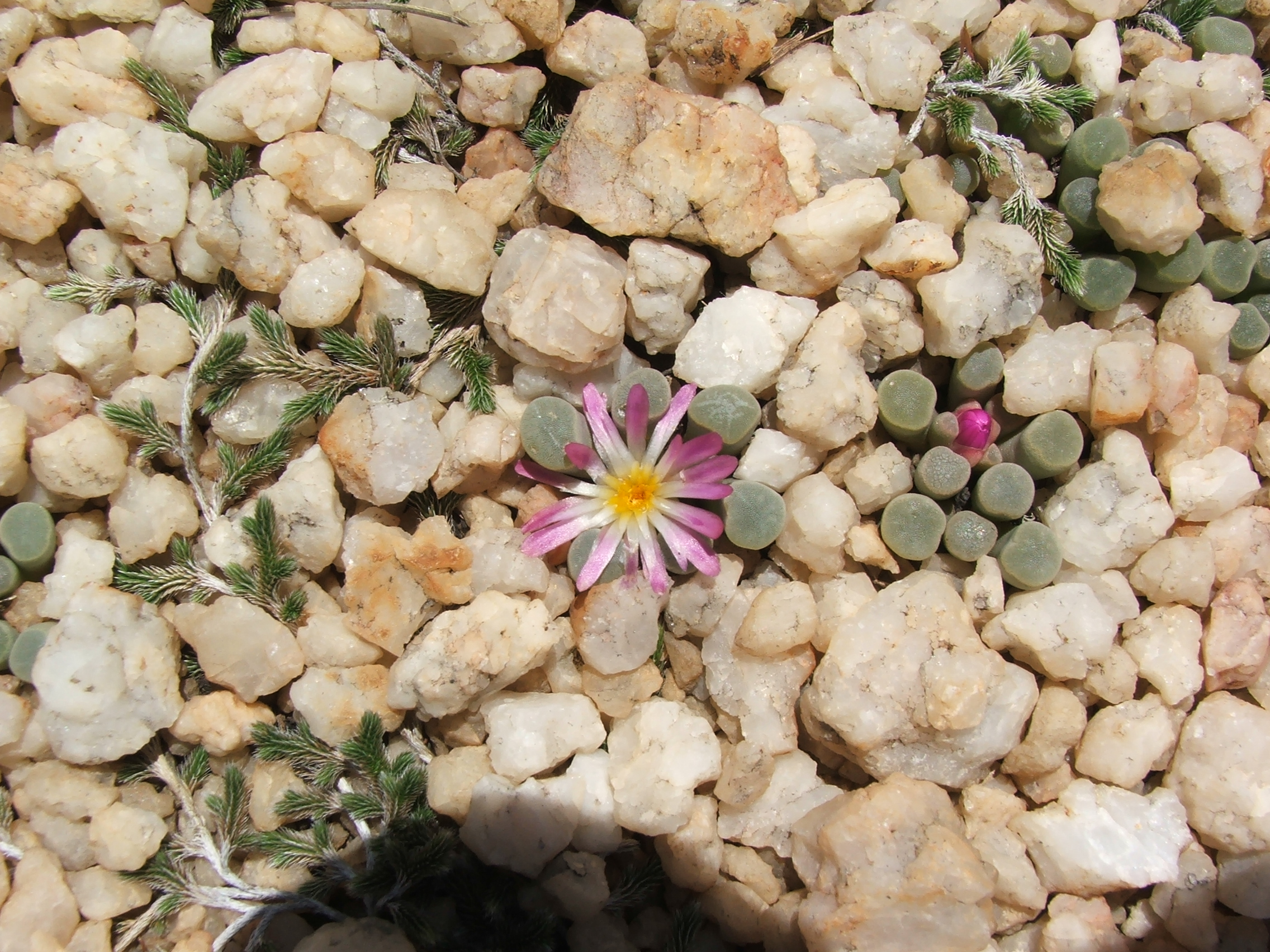
Flowering in its natural habitat

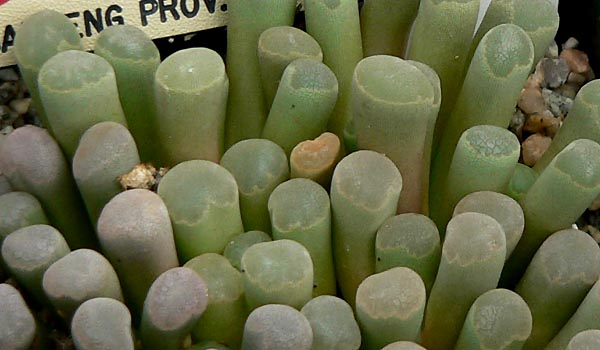
University of California Botanical Garden
