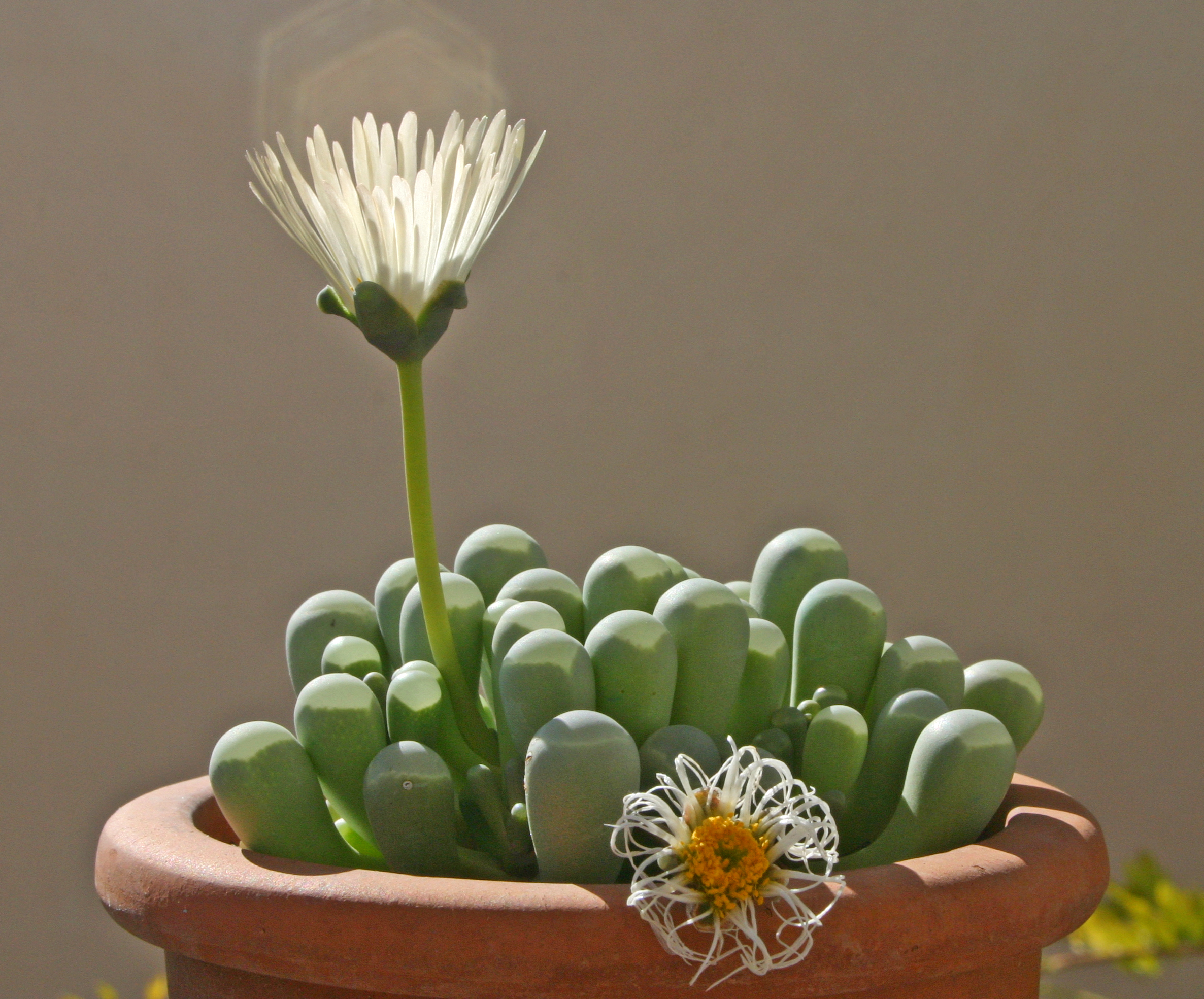
- Fenestraria rhopalophylla in flower

Scientific classification
- Kingdom: Plantae
- Clade: Tracheophytes
- Clade: Angiosperms
- Clade: Eudicots
- Order: Caryophyllales
- Family: Aizoaceae
- Subfamily: Ruschioideae
- Tribe: Ruschieae
- Genus: Fenestraria; N.E.Br.
- Species: F. rhopalophylla

Binomial name
- Fenestraria rhopalophylla (Schltr. & Diels) N.E.Br.

Synonyms
- Fenestraria aurantiaca f. rhopalophylla (Schltr. & Diels) G.D.Rowley; Mesembryanthemum rhopalophyllum Schltr. & Diels (1907) (basionym)

= Fenestraria =

Genus of succulents

Fenestraria (known as babies' toes) is a (possibly monotypic) genus of succulent plants in the family Aizoaceae, native to the Namaqualand in Namibia and the Cape Provinces of South Africa.

== Description ==
F. rhopalophylla

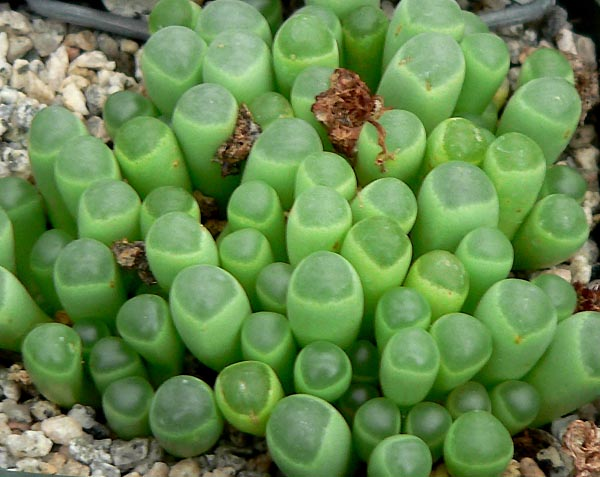
F. rhopalophylla subsp. aurantica

The only species currently recognised in this genus is Fenestraria rhopalophylla. Each leaf has an epidermal window, a transparent window-like area, at its rounded tip, it is for these window-like structures that the genus is named (Latin: fenestra).

Fenestraria rhopalophylla appears very similar to Frithia pulchra, though the leaves are a slightly different shape and F. rhopalophylla has yellow flowers, compared to the pink flowers of F. pulchra.

== Distribution and habitat ==
In the wild, the plant commonly grows under sand, except for the transparent tips, which allow light into the leaves for photosynthesis. The plant produces optical fibers made from crystalline oxalic acid which transmit light to subterranean photosynthetic sites.

Fenestraria rhopalophylla is native to Namaqualand in southern Africa and to Namibia. The plants generally grow in sandy or calciferous soils under low < 100 mm rainfall, that occurs in the winter.

== Subspecies ==
Two subspecies are accepted.

- F. rhopalophylla subsp. rhopalophylla – with white flowers in autumn; native to Namibia
- F. rhopalophylla subsp. aurantiaca (N.E.Br.) H.E.K.Hartmann (synonym F. aurantiaca N.E.Br.) – with yellow flowers; native to Namibia and the northwestern Cape Provinces
