= Leaf window =

Specialized leaf structure

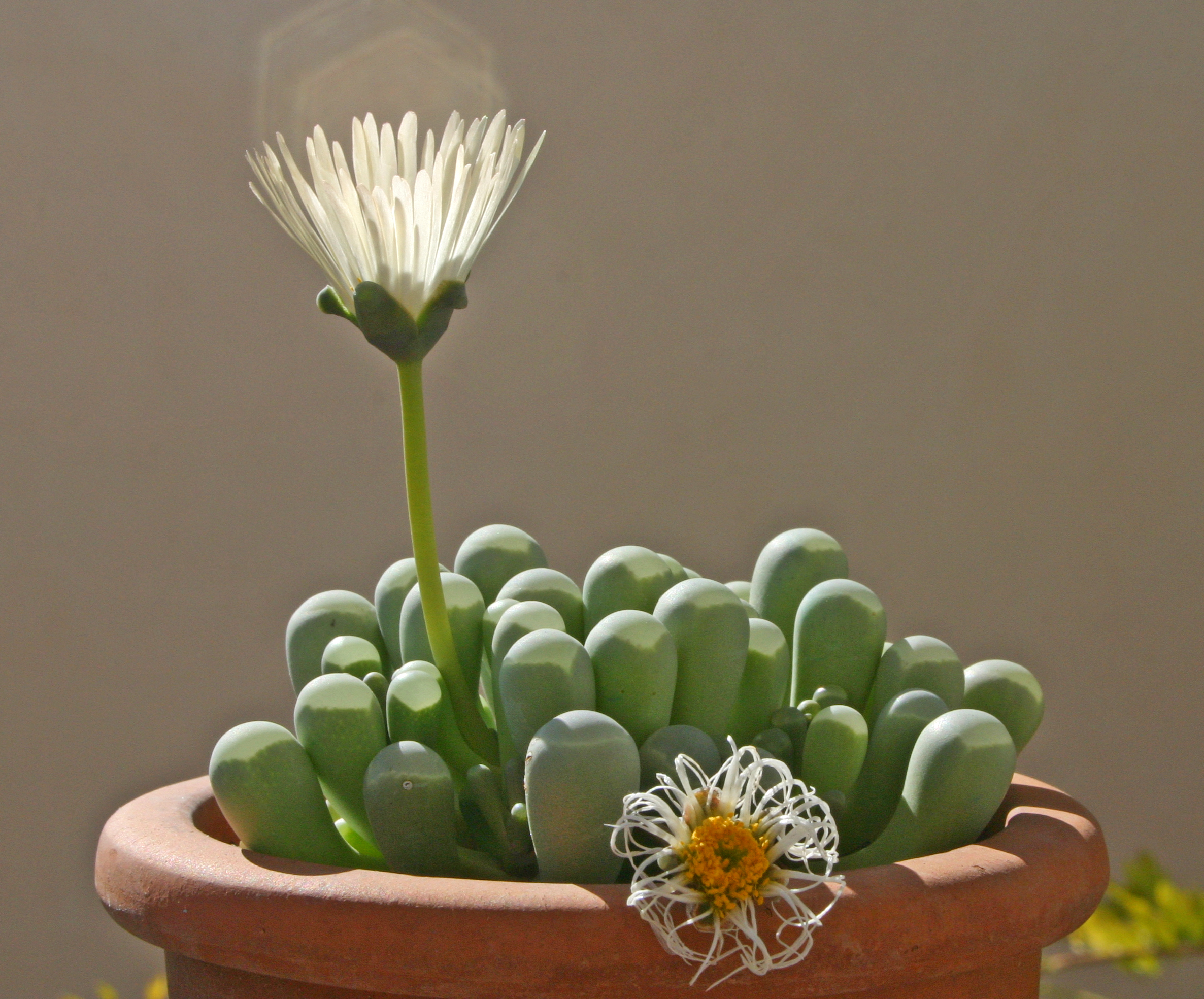
A flowering Fenestraria rhopalophylla, so named due to the translucent leaf window on the tips of its modified leaf.

A leaf window or epidermal window, also known as fenestration, is a specialized leaf structure consisting of a translucent area through which light can enter the interior surfaces of the leaf where photosynthesis can occur. The translucent structure may include epidermal tissue, and in some succulent plants it consists of several cell layers of parenchyma, which may also function as water-storage tissue. It can appear as a large continuous patch, a variegated or reticulated region, or as numerous small spots. It is found in some succulent plants native to arid climates, allowing much of the plant to remain beneath the soil surface where it is protected from desiccation by winds and heat while optimizing light absorption. Many species featuring leaf windows are native to Southern Africa.

== Functions ==
The primary function of the translucent windows is to increase the absorption of radiant energy, and thereby the rate of photosynthesis. Epidermal windows are commonly situated at the apex of leaves, allowing light to be captured and utilized even when the plant is almost entirely below the soil surface, minimizing exposure of leaf surface area to desiccation by intense heat. The windows focus and channel diffused light to the green photosynthesizing surface hidden inside the underground part of the plant. An absence of stomata in the translucent tissue prevents water loss. It has been found in the Lithops species of succulents that leaf window size correlates inversely with habitat solar irradiance; plants growing in regions of high irradiance and low rainfall have smaller windows than those growing in cloudy, high-rainfall regions.

The carnivorous cobra lily (Darlingtonia californica) uses fenestration to confuse insects and increase the effectiveness of its trap.

== Species ==
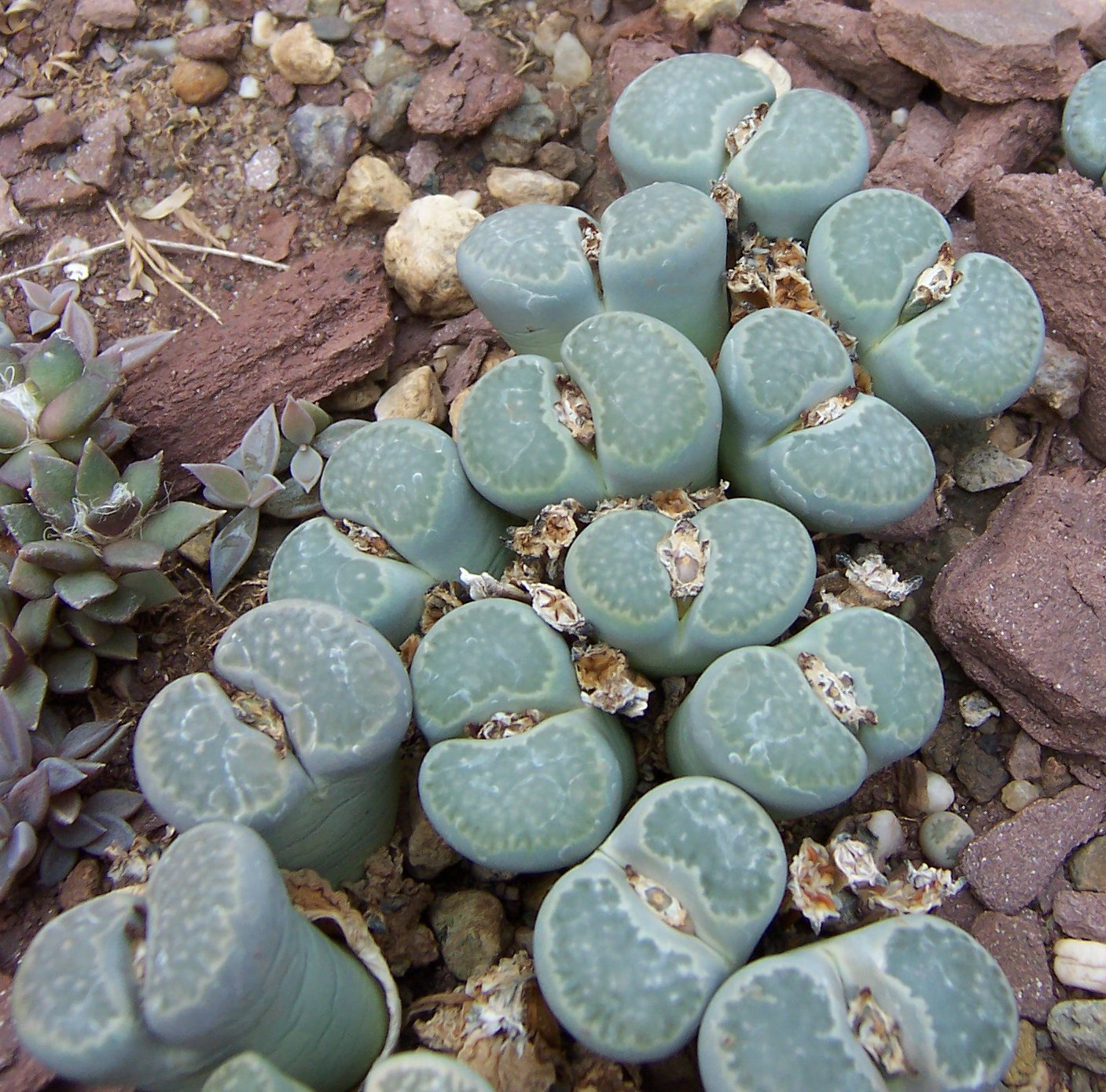
The epidermal window of Lithops salicola has a mottled appearance, which acts as camouflage

Genera of plants with numerous species having translucent epidermal windows include:

- Bulbine spp. (B. haworthioides, B. mesembryanthemoides, etc.)
- Conophytum spp.
- Callisia spp. (C. navicularis, etc.)
- Fenestraria spp.
- Frithia spp.
- Haworthia spp.
- Haworthiopsis spp. (H. koelmaniorum, H. tessellata, etc.)
- Lithops spp.
- Pleiospilos spp. (Questionable)
- Peperomia spp.: notably P. columella and P. nivalis
- Sarracenia spp.

Several other plant species have epidermal windows:

- Cephalotus follicularis
- Darlingtonia californica
- Senecio rowleyanus

Plants with leaf windows are sometimes known as window plants, though this is also the common name used to refer to Fenestraria rhopalophylla.

== See also ==
- Perforate leaf, leaves which have holes
