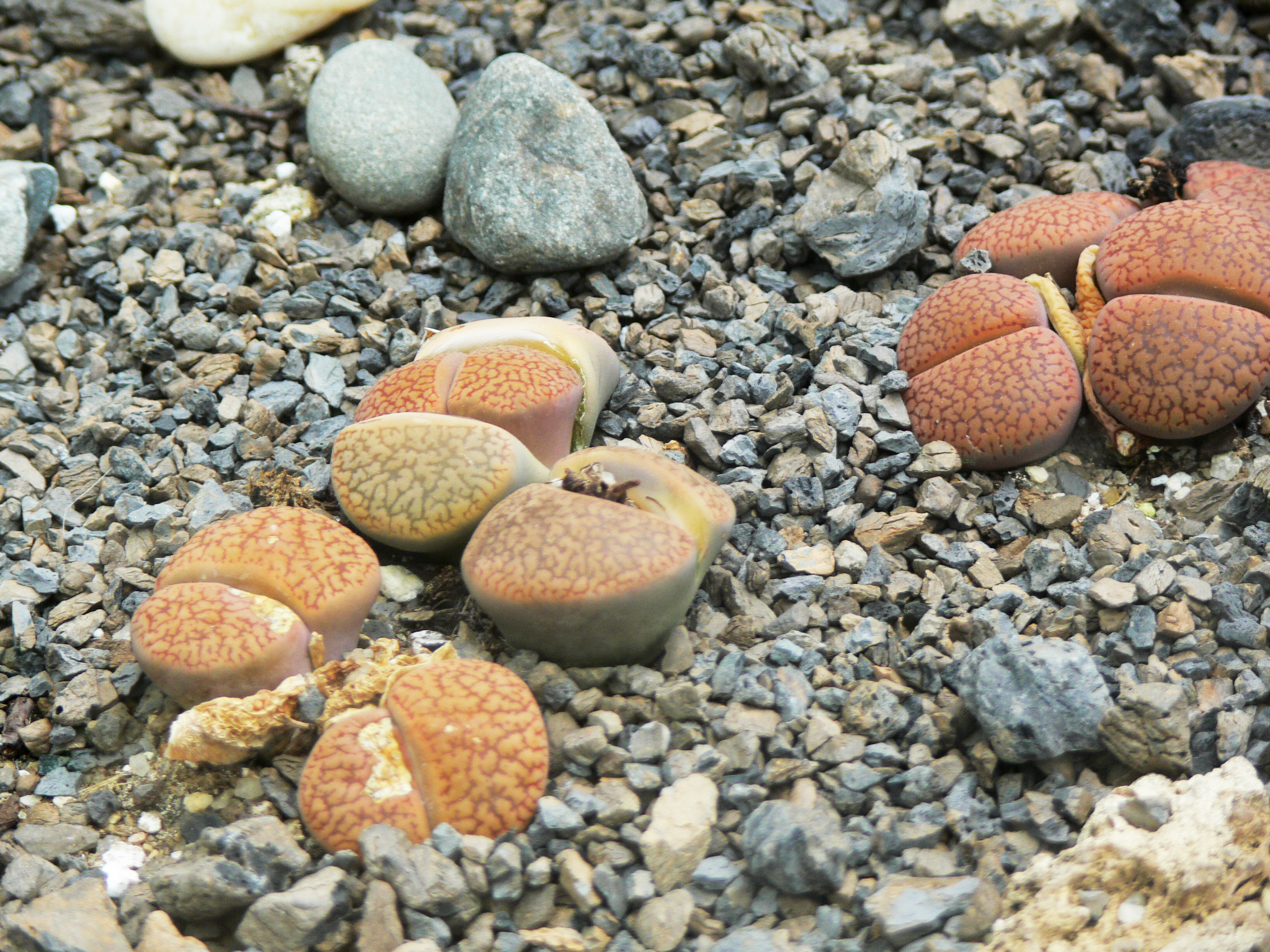

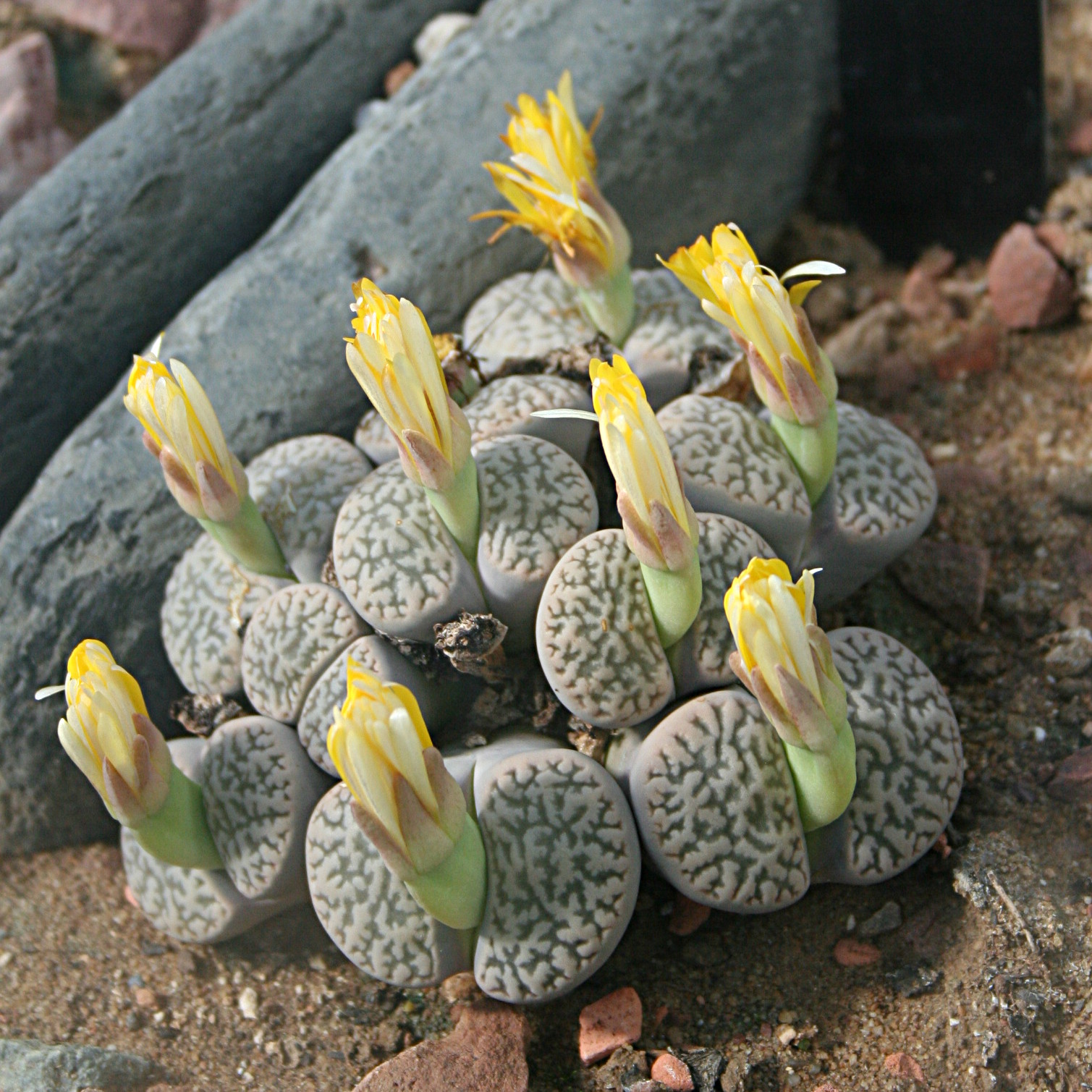

Scientific classification
- Kingdom: Plantae
- Clade: Embryophytes
- Clade: Tracheophytes
- Clade: Angiosperms
- Clade: Eudicots
- Order: Caryophyllales
- Family: Aizoaceae
- Genus: Lithops
- Species: L. hookeri

Binomial name
- Lithops hookeri (A.Berger) Schwantes

Synonyms
- Lithops aurantiaca L.Bolus; Lithops dabneri L.Bolus; Lithops hookeri var. dabneri (L.Bolus) D.T.Cole; Lithops hookeri var. elephina (D.T.Cole) D.T.Cole; Lithops hookeri var. lutea (de Boer) D.T.Cole; Lithops hookeri var. marginata (Nel) D.T.Cole; Lithops hookeri var. subfenestrata (de Boer) D.T.Cole; Lithops hookeri var. susannae (D.T.Cole) D.T.Cole; Lithops marginata Nel; Lithops turbiniformis var. dabneri (L.Bolus) D.T.Cole; Lithops turbiniformis var. marginata (Nel) D.T.Cole; Mesembryanthemum hookeri A.Berger

= Lithops hookeri =

Species of plant

Lithops hookeri is a species of plant in the genus Lithops, in the family Aizoaceae. It is native to the Northern Cape province of South Africa.
