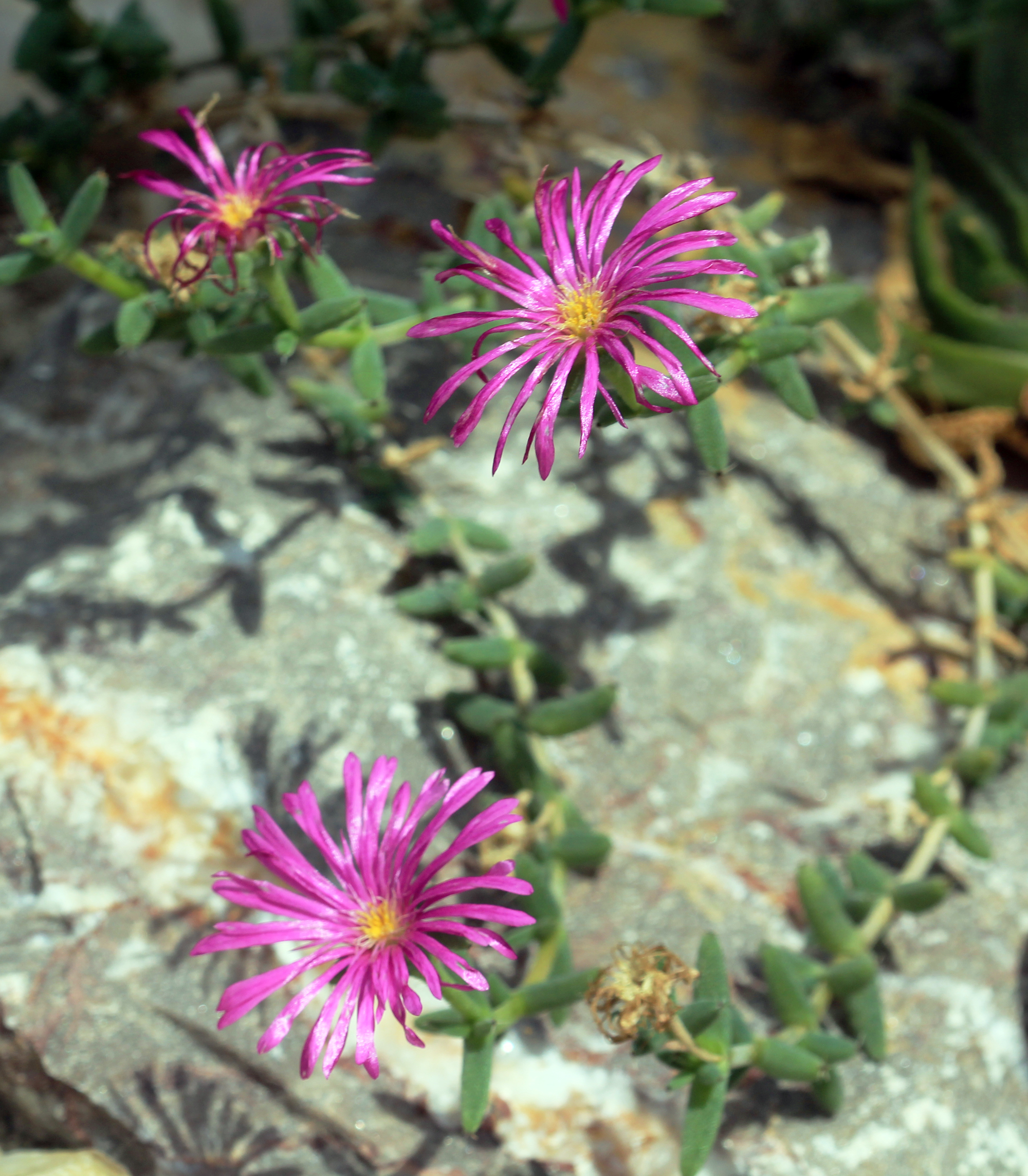

Scientific classification
- Kingdom: Plantae
- Clade: Tracheophytes
- Clade: Angiosperms
- Clade: Eudicots
- Order: Caryophyllales
- Family: Aizoaceae
- Genus: Trichodiadema
- Species: T. barbatum

Binomial name
- Trichodiadema barbatum (L.) Schwantes

Synonyms
- List: Mesembryanthemum barbatum L.; Mesembryanthemum stellatum Mill.; Mesembryanthemum stelligerum Haw.; Trichodiadema stellatum (Mill.) Schwantes; Trichodiadema stelligerum (Haw.) Schwantes

= Trichodiadema barbatum =

Species of plant

Trichodiadema barbatum is succulent plant of the genus Trichodiadema, native to the Eastern Cape Province, South Africa.

== Description ==
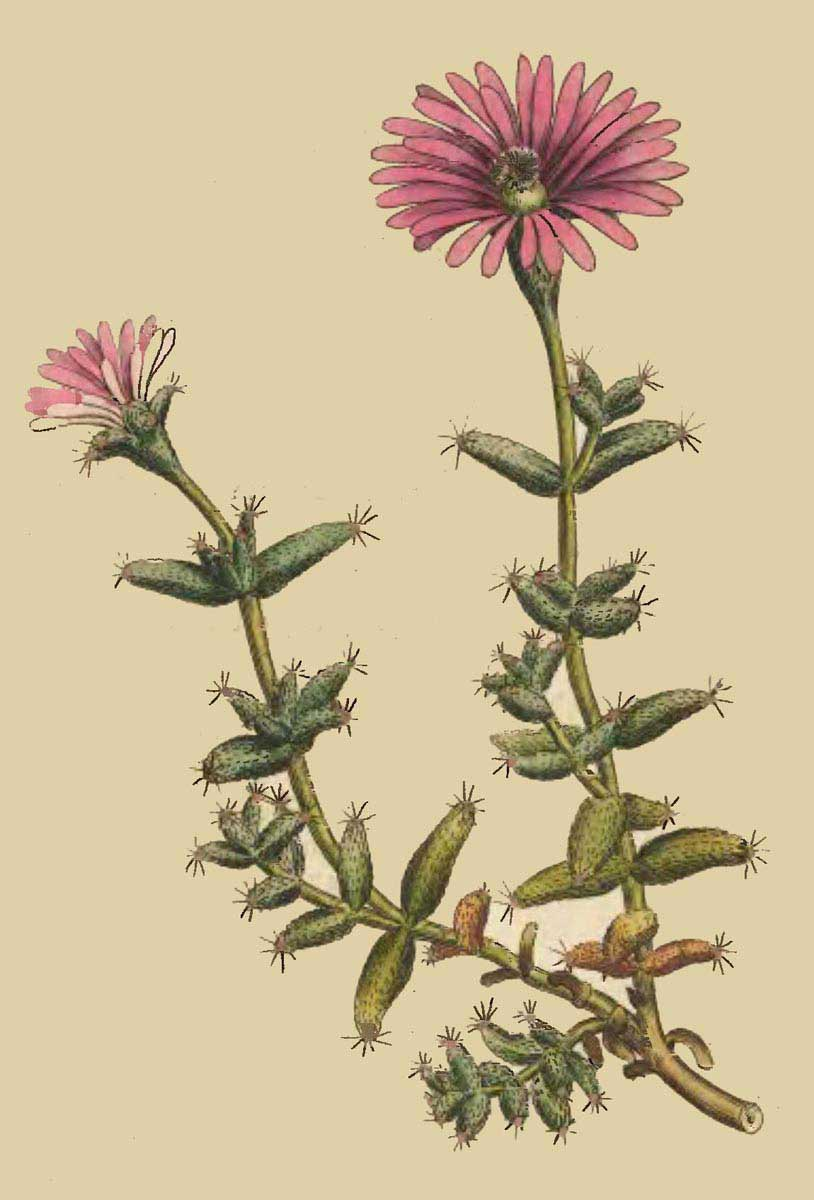
Botanical illustration of Trichodiadema barbatum (as Mesembryanthemum barbatum)

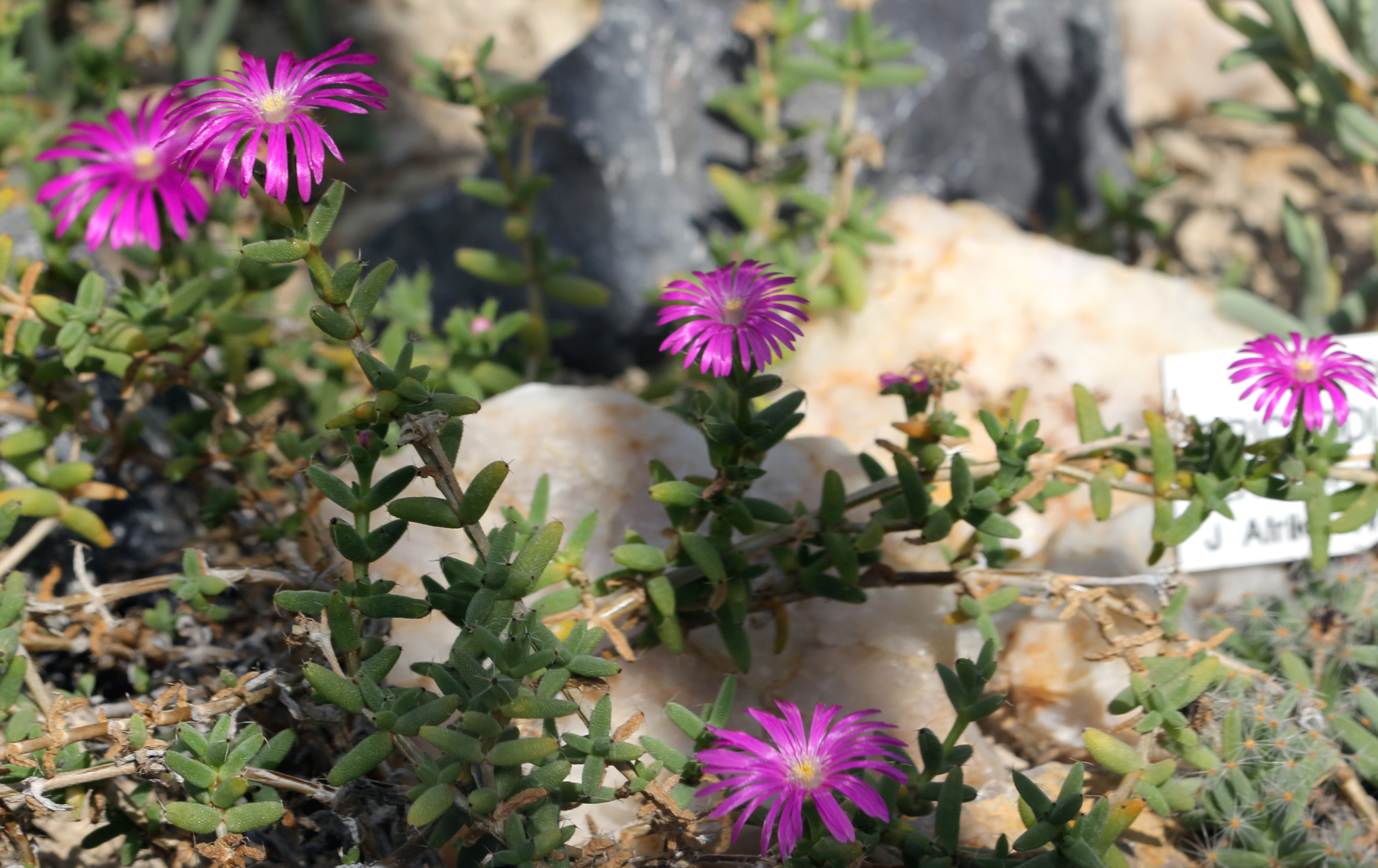
Trichodiadema barbatum in cultivation

A small, gracile, erect-to-decumbent plant, with long, slender, fragile, stick-like branches. The internodes are minutely papillate; On young branches the internodes are green, becoming grey on older branches.

The grey-green leaves are slightly triangular in cross-section, and have large bladder cells on their leaf-surface. Bristles (5-7) emerge from the dark tip of the leaf.

The solitary, bright pink-to-purple flowers are born on long pedicels. They have petals with slightly notched apices, small pale filamentous staminodes, and yellow anthers.

The fruit capsule is 5-locular, like that of Trichodiadema burgeri (but unlike some other species in the genus, such as Trichodiadema densum and Trichodiadema marlothii.

It has gained the Royal Horticultural Society's Award of Garden Merit.
