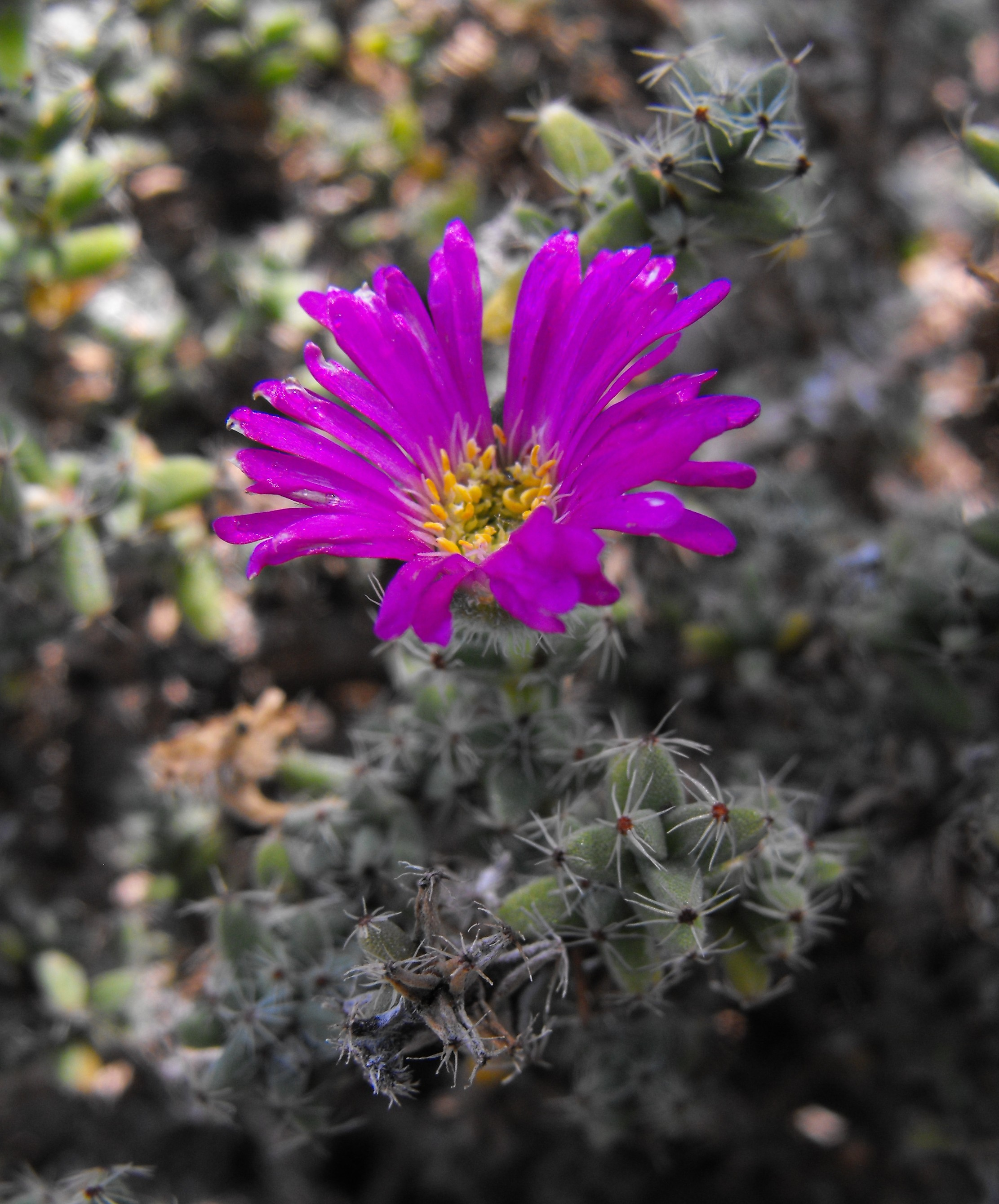

Scientific classification
- Kingdom: Plantae
- Clade: Tracheophytes
- Clade: Angiosperms
- Clade: Eudicots
- Order: Caryophyllales
- Family: Aizoaceae
- Genus: Trichodiadema
- Species: T. intonsum

Binomial name
- Trichodiadema intonsum Schwantes

Synonyms
- Trichodiadema bulbosum Schwantes

= Trichodiadema intonsum =

Species of succulent

Trichodiadema intonsum (not to be confused with the yellow-flowered Trichodiadema introrsum) is succulent plant of the genus Trichodiadema, native to the Eastern Cape Province, South Africa.

== Description ==
A small, low, clumping shrub. The leaves are tipped with radiating bristles (diadems) that have dark cup cells at the base. These bristles come together to form a hard and extremely sharp point.

The solitary flowers are pink, on short stalks, and the base of the calyx is hairy.

The fruit capsule has five locules (not six like T. marlothii or T. densum).
