= Trichodiadema strumosum =

Scientific classification
- Kingdom: Plantae
- Clade: Tracheophytes
- Clade: Angiosperms
- Clade: Eudicots
- Order: Caryophyllales
- Family: Aizoaceae
- Genus: Trichodiadema
- Species: T. strumosum

Binomial name
- Trichodiadema strumosum (Haw.) L.Bolus

Synonyms
- Mesembryanthemum strumosum Haw.

Species of succulent

Trichodiadema strumosum is succulent plant of the genus Trichodiadema, native to the Western Cape Province, South Africa, where it is found in loam-based soils in the Fynbos vegetation of the Swellendam region.

== Description ==
This mat-forming species is one of the few species in the genus that do not have the typical leaf-tip diadems. It is also one of three species that have leaves entirely covered in dense hairs (together with T.fergusoniae and T.pygmaeum).

Its growth form is erect to partially decumbent (but not mat-forming like T.pygmaeum). In its general growth-form, it is most similar to T.gracile, which differs in having leaves with bead-like epidermal cells and not hairy.

The hairs on the leaves are loosely arranged, and each is on a small rounded bump on the epidermal cell (not with a broad base, like the hairs of T.fergusoniae).

The flowers are pale apricot coloured, each petal with a deep purple line along the centre.
