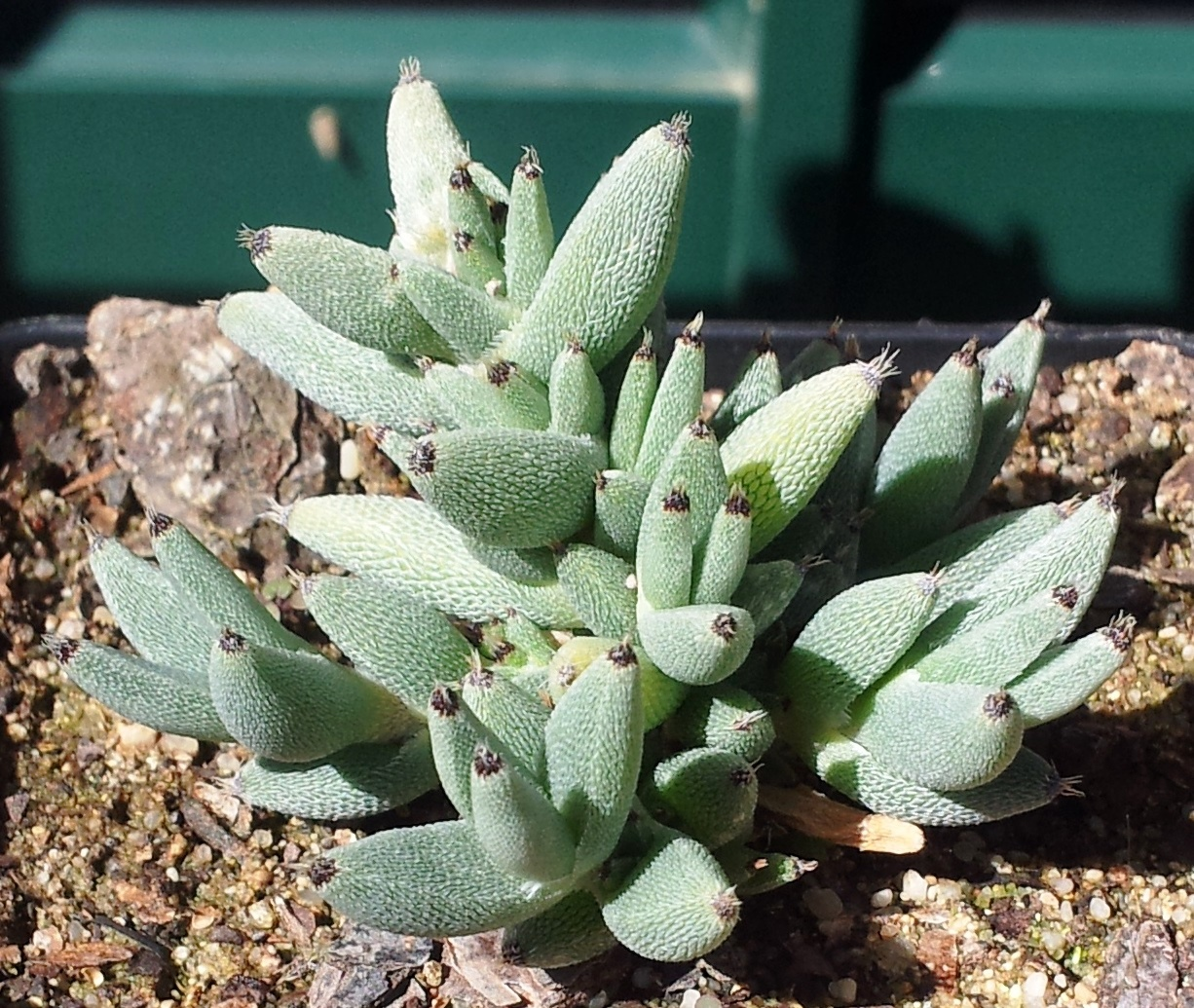
- Juvenile T. mirabile in cultivation

Scientific classification
- Kingdom: Plantae
- Clade: Tracheophytes
- Clade: Angiosperms
- Clade: Eudicots
- Order: Caryophyllales
- Family: Aizoaceae
- Genus: Trichodiadema
- Species: T. mirabile

Binomial name
- Trichodiadema mirabile (N.E.Br.) Schwantes

= Trichodiadema mirabile =

Species of succulent

Trichodiadema mirabile is succulent plant of the genus Trichodiadema, native to the Western Cape Province, South Africa, where it is known from the Laingsburg area and especially from south-facing slopes.

== Description ==
A small, erect shrublet, reaching up to 11 cm.

The leaves are erect, stiff and papillate, and each leaf is tipped with dark-brown, erect-inclining bristles.

The flowers are white to pale-cream in colour, with white filamentous staminodes at the centre, and are on very short stalks (subsessile).

The fruit capsule has six locules, each locule with distinctive V-shaped covering membranes.

=== Related species ===
It very closely resembles Trichodiadema orientale, a species from the Eastern Cape, which however has 5 locules, longer papillae on its bladder cells, and has flowers that are more pinkish-white (sometimes white with pinkish petal tips). Trichodiadema orientale also has longer flower stalks, while those of T. mirabile are so short that they are usually not visible.

Trichodiadema mirabile, T. orientale and T. hallii are the only three species in the genus to have erect-inclining diadem bristles.
