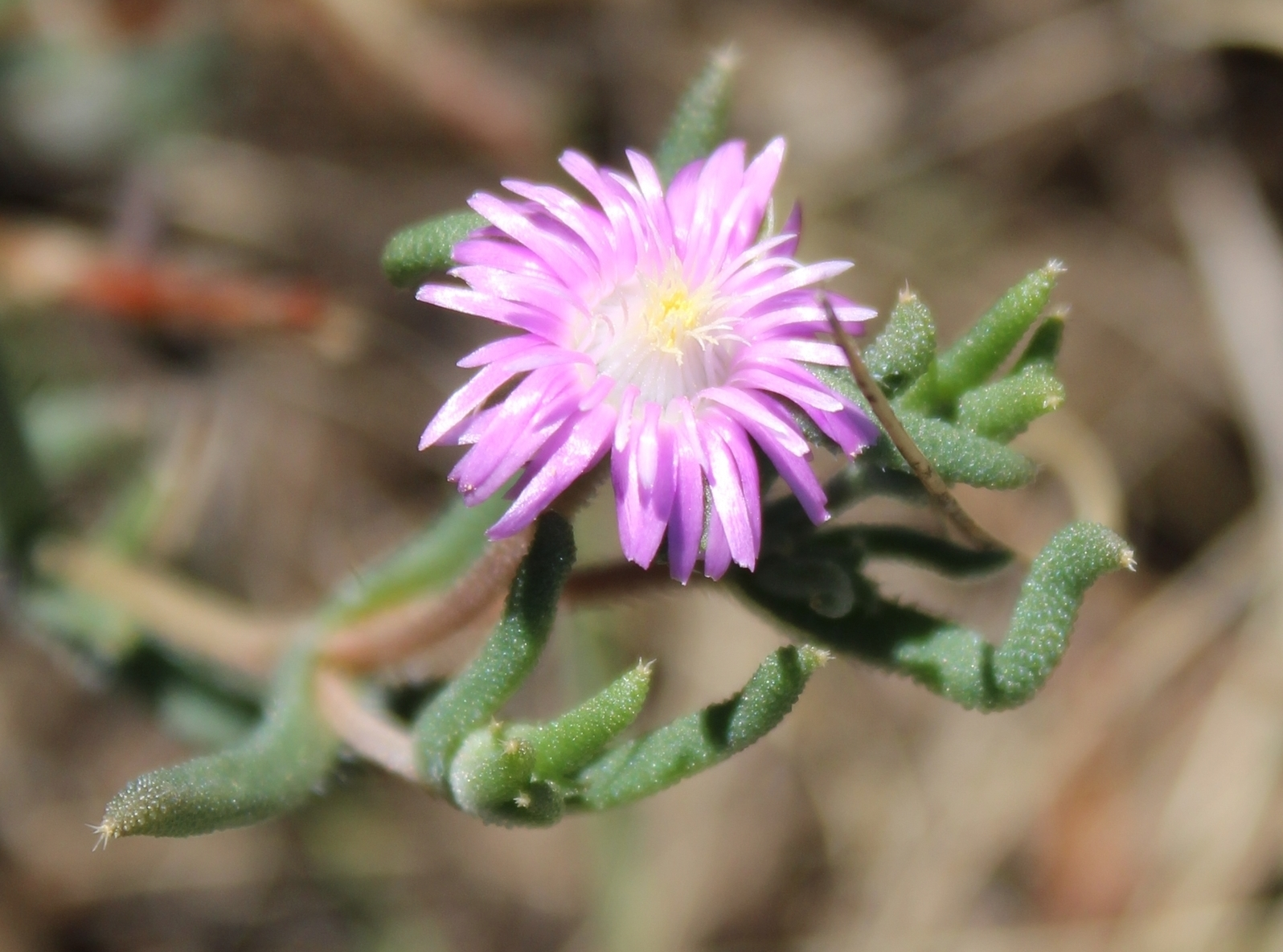

Scientific classification
- Kingdom: Plantae
- Clade: Tracheophytes
- Clade: Angiosperms
- Clade: Eudicots
- Order: Caryophyllales
- Family: Aizoaceae
- Genus: Trichodiadema
- Species: T. setuliferum

Binomial name
- Trichodiadema setuliferum (N. E. Br.) Schwant.

= Trichodiadema setuliferum =

Species of succulent

Trichodiadema setuliferum is a succulent plant of the genus Trichodiadema, native to the Karoo regions of the Cape Provinces, South Africa.

== Description ==
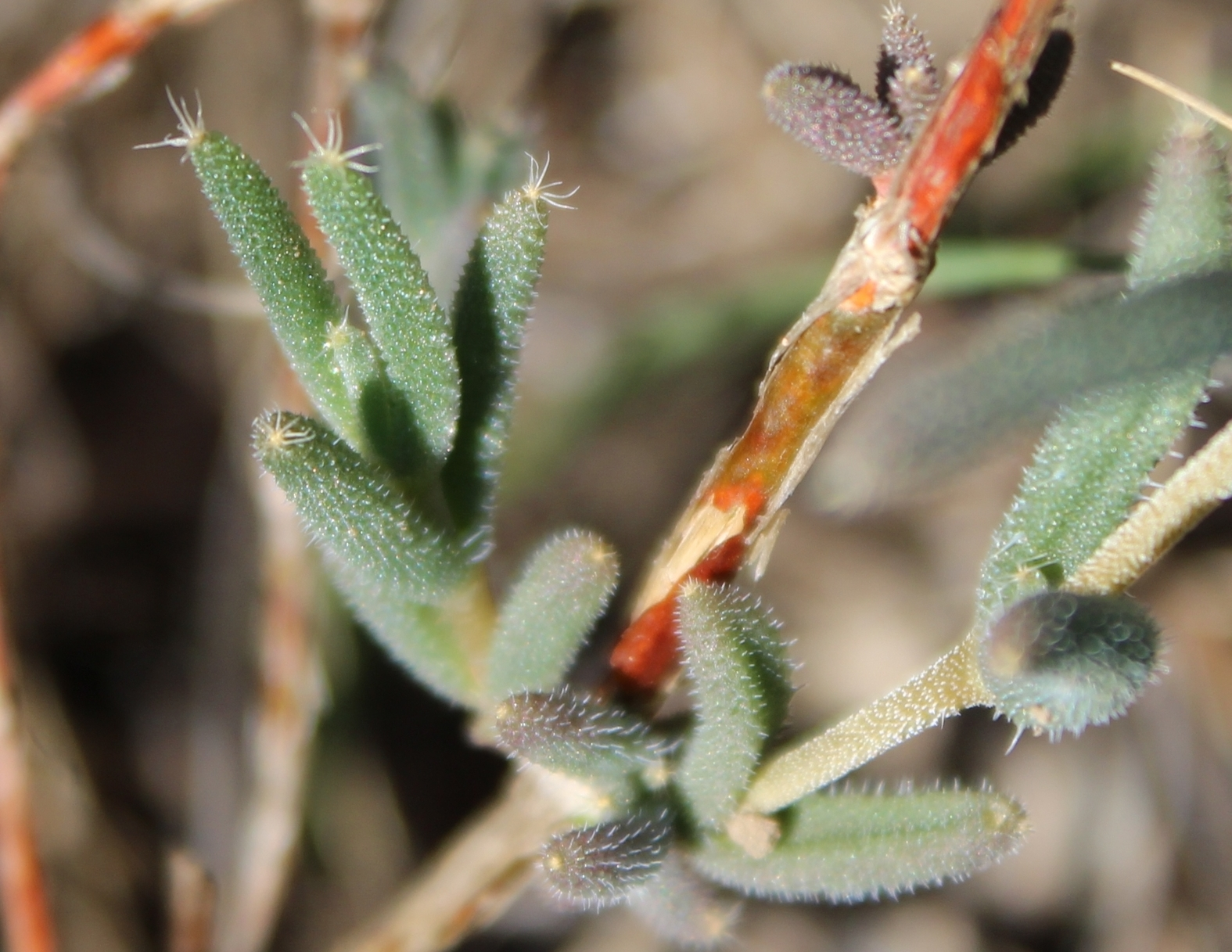
The papillate bladder cells on Trichodiadema setuliferum leaves.

It is a small, gracile, semi-erect plant, with long and minutely-papillate internodes.

The leaves can reach a length of 24 mm, and are covered in bladder cells that have apically curving hair-like papillae.

Apically the leaves are slightly recurved, and each has a diadem of up to 16 yellow-orange bristles.

The flowers are pink to magenta.

=== Related species ===
This species is very similar to the partly syntopic Trichodiadema pomeridianum and Trichodiadema rogersiae.

T. setuliferum can be distinguished from the other two by its papillate bladder cells; while those of the other two species are smooth and without papillae.

In addition, Trichodiadema pomeridianum has much shorter leaves (only c.15 mm), while Trichodiadema rogersiae is a smaller plant with thicker, stronger branches. There are also fewer diadem bristles on both Trichodiadema pomeridianum (only 3-8) and Trichodiadema rogersiae (only 5-9).
