= Trichodiadema hallii =

Scientific classification
- Kingdom: Plantae
- Clade: Tracheophytes
- Clade: Angiosperms
- Clade: Eudicots
- Order: Caryophyllales
- Family: Aizoaceae
- Genus: Trichodiadema
- Species: T. hallii

Binomial name
- Trichodiadema hallii L.Bolus

Species of succulent

Trichodiadema hallii is succulent plant of the genus Trichodiadema, native to the Ladismith and Calitzdorp areas of the Western Cape Province, South Africa.

== Description ==
A very small, erect shrublet, up to 6 cm tall in habitat, taller in cultivation, with tuberous roots.

The leaves are stiff, hard, and densely packed along the stems, making the internodes invisible. ↵They are covered in long epidermal cells with robust papillae. The leaf tips have about 10 orange-brown bristles in an erect, inclined diadem.

The diadem bristles are an easy feature for identification, as this is the only species with erect, inclined orange-brown diadems (the diadems of Trichodiadema orientale and Trichodiadema Mirabile are also erect-inclining but brown).

The flower stalks are another easy feature for identification, as they are extremely short and often cannot be seen at all. The flowers are pale pink to white, with petals in two series. The fruit capsule has five or six locules (sometimes four).
