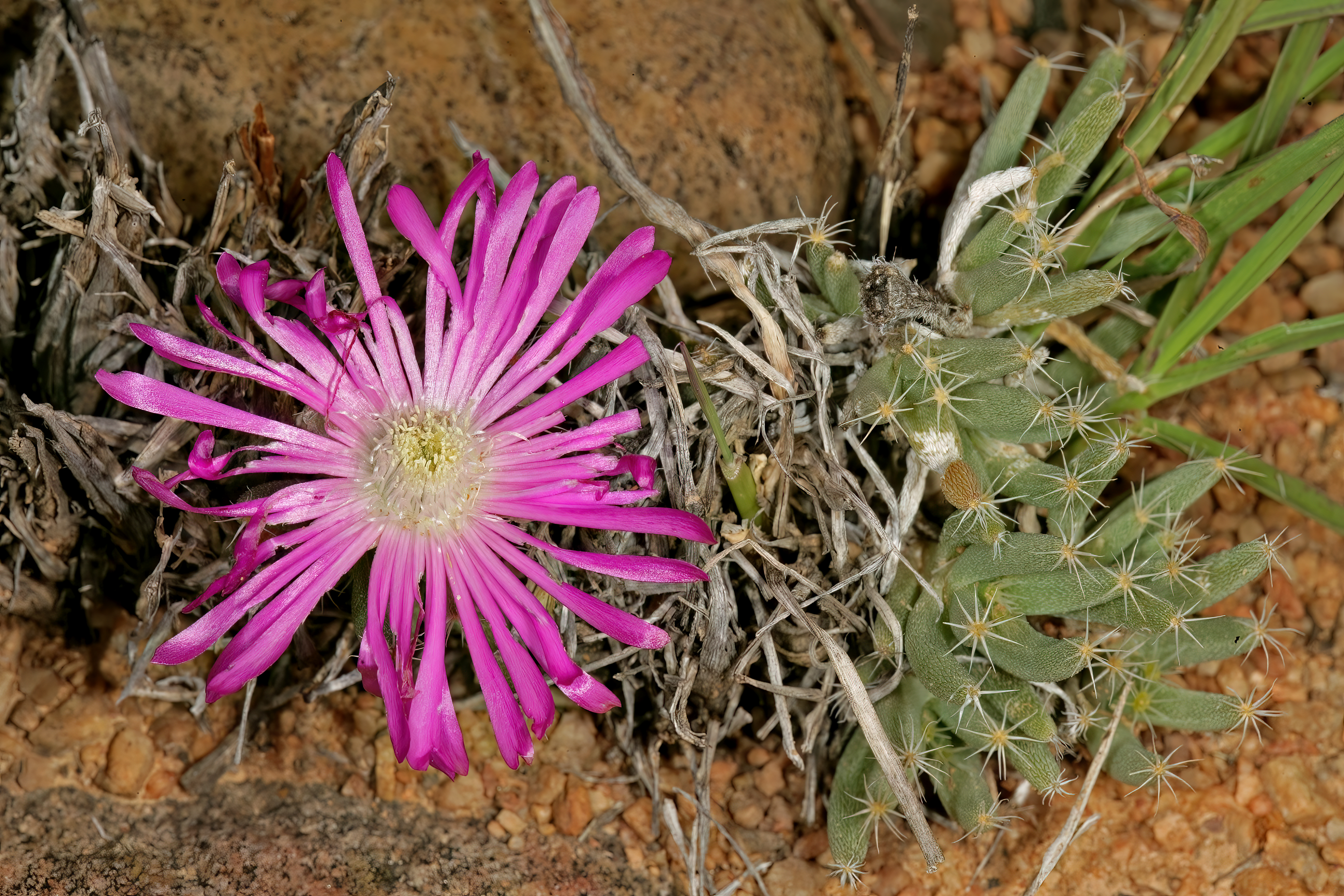
- Trichodiadema burgeri

Conservation status
- Endangered (IUCN 3.1)https://nph.onlinelibrary.wiley.com/doi/full/10.1111/nph.19592

Scientific classification
- Kingdom: Plantae
- Clade: Tracheophytes
- Clade: Angiosperms
- Clade: Eudicots
- Order: Caryophyllales
- Family: Aizoaceae
- Genus: Trichodiadema
- Species: T. burgeri

Binomial name
- Trichodiadema burgeri L.Bolus

= Trichodiadema burgeri =

Species of succulent

Trichodiadema burgeri is succulent plant of the genus Trichodiadema, native to the Western Cape Province, South Africa, where it is known from the Ladismith and Oudtshoorn regions, extending southwards towards Mossel Bay.

== Description ==
A small, erect, clumping shrub. The imbricate leaves are tipped with up to 14 white radiating bristles (the typical diadems of the genus).

The flowers are pink-to-reddish in colour, with filamentous staminodes at the centre. The flower stalk and base are covered in thick hairs. Unlike the similar Trichodiadema intonsum however, it does not have stiff black hairs around the base of its calyx.

The pale fruit capsule has five locules (not six like T. densum or T. marlothii), each with very well developed covering membranes.

This species very closely resembles Trichodiadema densum, which is more compact and has six locules.
