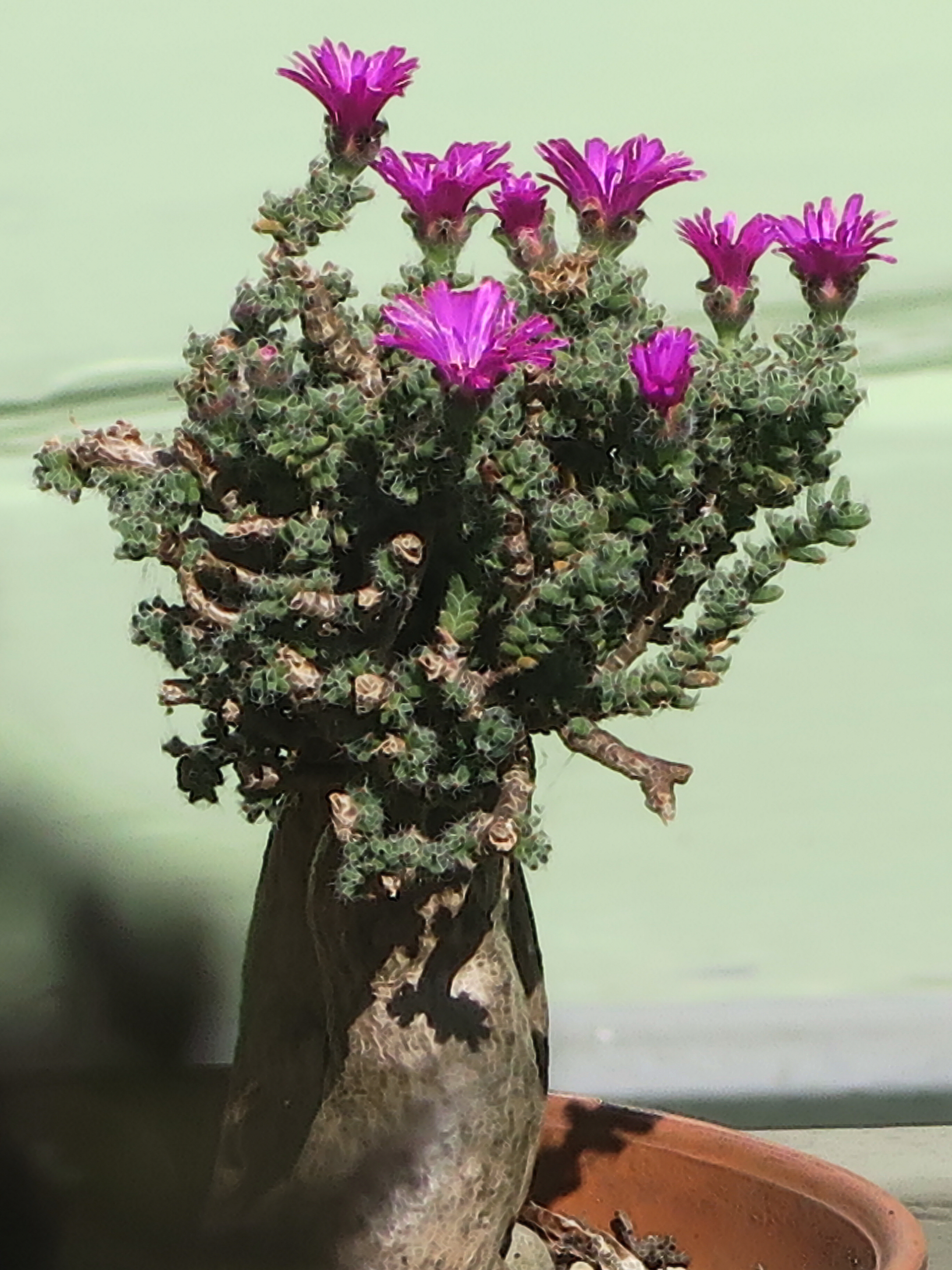

Scientific classification
- Kingdom: Plantae
- Clade: Tracheophytes
- Clade: Angiosperms
- Clade: Eudicots
- Order: Caryophyllales
- Family: Aizoaceae
- Genus: Trichodiadema
- Species: T. bulbosum

Binomial name
- Trichodiadema bulbosum Schwantes, 1926

= Trichodiadema bulbosum =

Species of succulent

Trichodiadema bulbosum is a succulent plant of the genus Trichodiadema, native to South Africa.

According to POWO and the WCSP, it is a synonym of Trichodiadema intonsum.

== Description ==
It is a small, erect shrub with pink flowers. The erectly held branches are one feature that can distinguish this species from its relatives.

Another key feature is its bulbous tuber. This basal caudex is mostly underground, but the top of it often rises out of the ground.

The fruit capsule has five locules.

A very distinctive character is the covering of its leaves. Each leaf has shorter bristle-like papillae all over its leaves. It also has the typical Trichodiadema diadem of bristles on the tip of each leaf. The dense bristles make a spider-web like covering over the entire plant.
