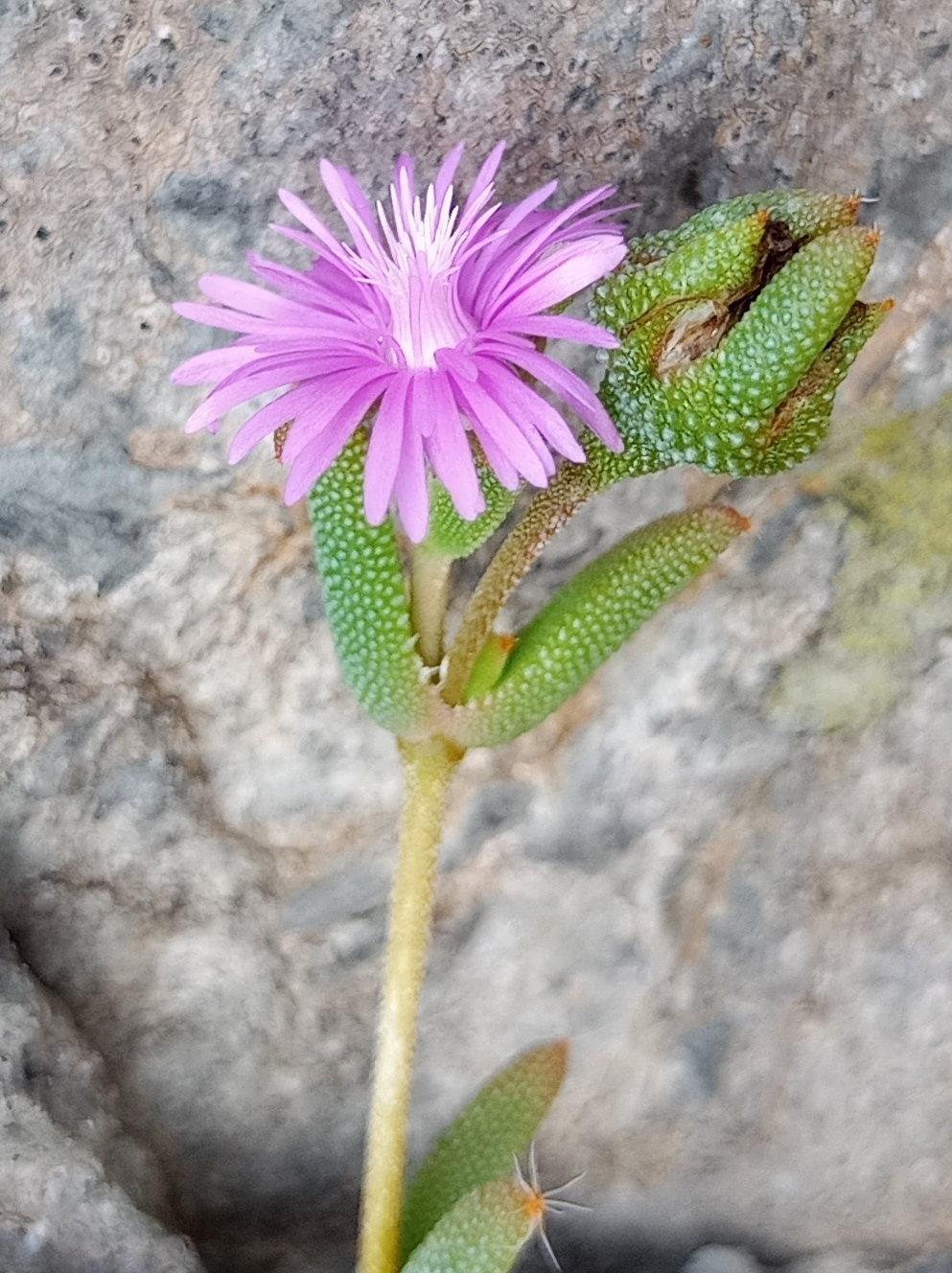

Scientific classification
- Kingdom: Plantae
- Clade: Tracheophytes
- Clade: Angiosperms
- Clade: Eudicots
- Order: Caryophyllales
- Family: Aizoaceae
- Genus: Trichodiadema
- Species: T. pomeridianum

Binomial name
- Trichodiadema pomeridianum L.Bolus

= Trichodiadema pomeridianum =

Species of succulent

Trichodiadema pomeridianum ("Perde vygie") is a succulent plant of the genus Trichodiadema, widespread in the arid central Karoo regions of South Africa.

== Description ==
It grows as a loosely branching semi-erect shrublet up to 30 cm high. The internodes are long, and rough from minute white papillae.

The leaves are ca. 15 mm long and ca. 2 mm wide. The leaf surfaces are densely covered in bladder cells that do not have papillae (except at the basal leaf margins). The leaf tips have simple diadems of 3-8 yellow bristles, radiating from similarly yellow cup cells.

The petals are pink-to-purple in colour, and born in two series.

This species is easily confused with T. setuliferum, which however has much longer leaves (reaching 24mm).
