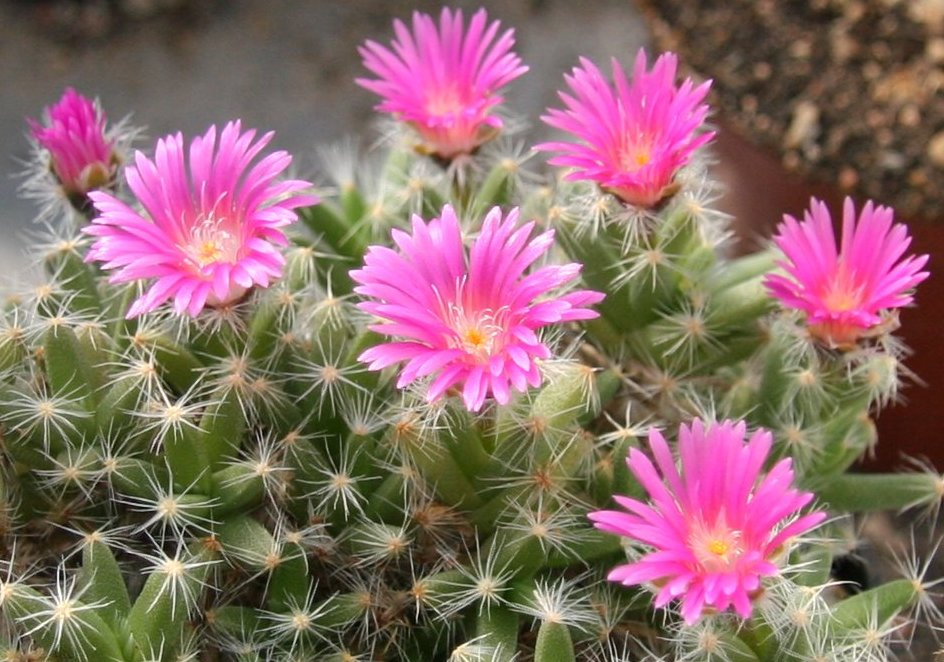
- Trichodiadema densum

Scientific classification
- Kingdom: Plantae
- Clade: Tracheophytes
- Clade: Angiosperms
- Clade: Eudicots
- Order: Caryophyllales
- Family: Aizoaceae
- Subfamily: Ruschioideae
- Tribe: Ruschieae
- Genus: Trichodiadema; Schwantes (1926)

Species
- See text

= Trichodiadema =

Genus of succulents

Trichodiadema is a genus of succulent plants of the family Aizoaceae. It includes 32 species native to Namibia and the Cape Provinces, Free State, and Northern Provinces of South Africa.

The name "Trichodiadema" comes from the ancient Greek "τρῐχός" (hair, bristle) and "διαδεμα" (crown).

== Description ==
Trichodiadema are small, short-stemmed succulents with small, elongated, alternating sections measuring 8 mm long. They are grey and green.

At the apex of each alternating section is a ring of small bristles radiating around the center, that give the appearance of a cactus areola.

The flowers look like daisies, with red, pink or white petals, earning them the nickname "Desert Rose". Two species however, Trichodiadema aureum and Trichodiadema introrsum, have flowers that are yellow.

== Cultivation ==
The plant requires sun exposure (although not too intense), and well-drained soil.

Propagation is by division of the clumps. Propagation by cuttings is difficult, because of the risk of rot.

Trichodiademum densum has gained the Royal Horticultural Society's Award of Garden Merit.

== List of species ==
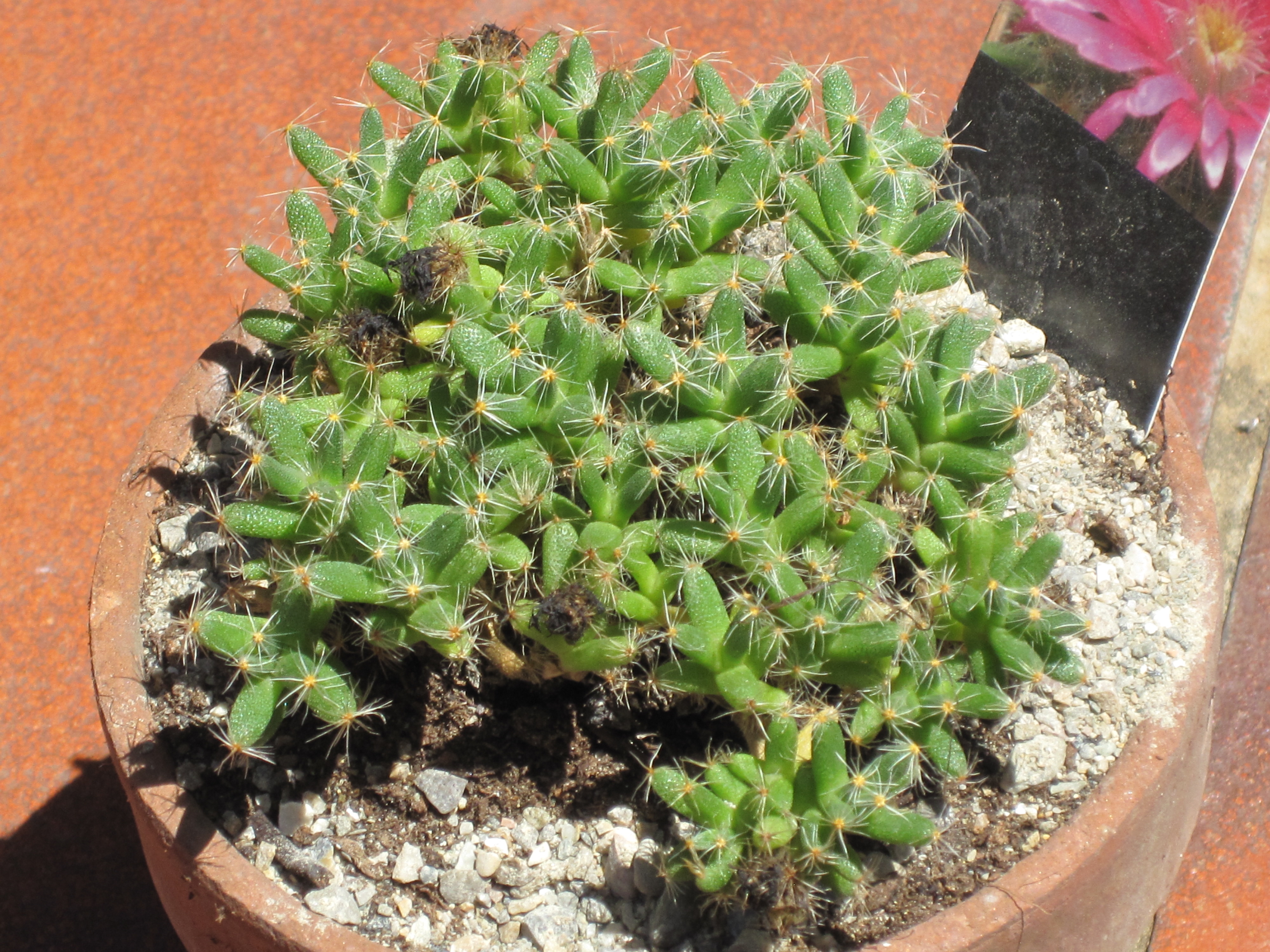
Trichodiadema densum

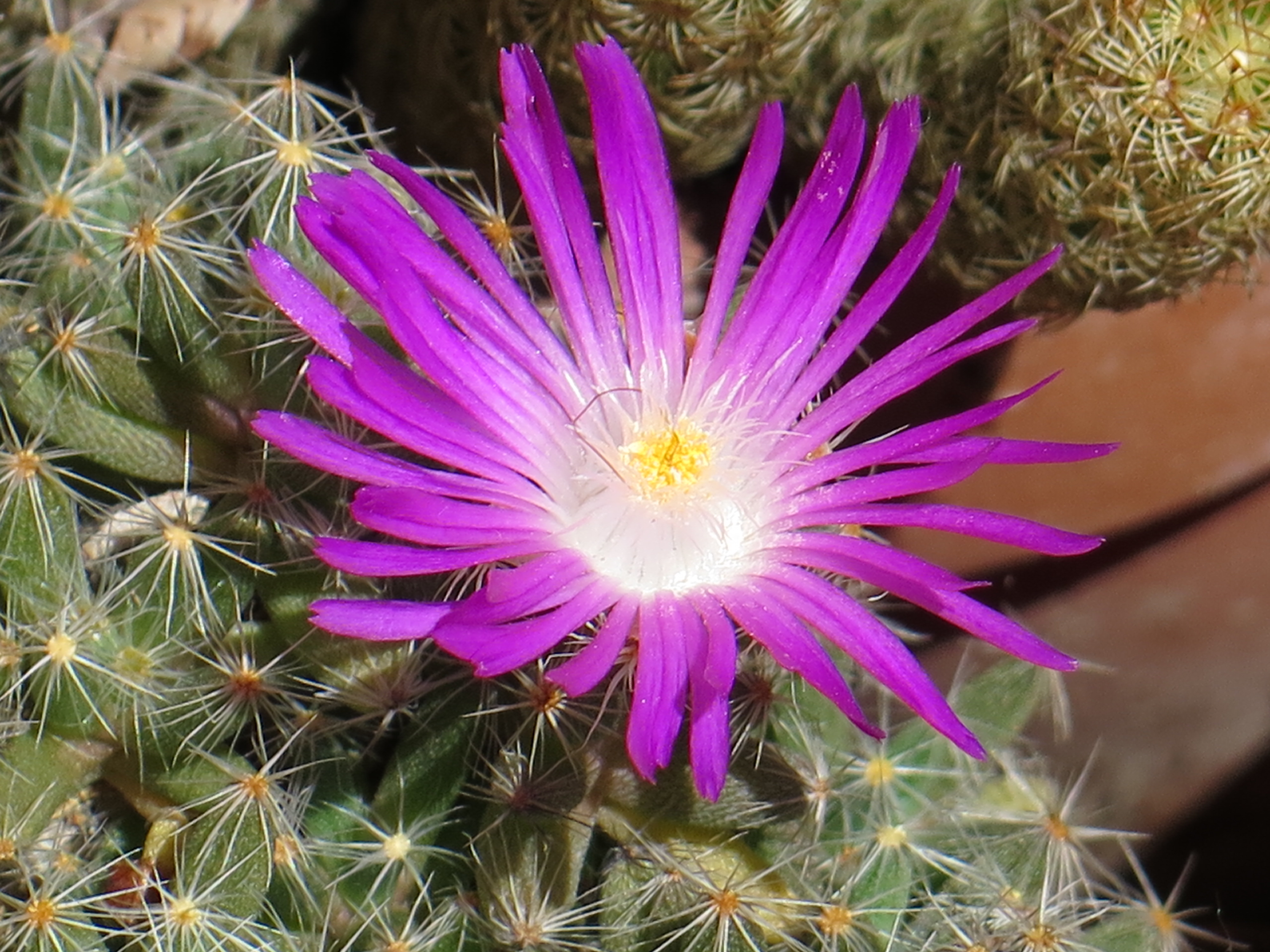
The flower

- Trichodiadema attonsum Schwantes
- Trichodiadema aureum L.Bolus
- Trichodiadema barbatum Schwantes
- Trichodiadema bulbosum Schwantes
- Trichodiadema burgeri L.Bolus
- Trichodiadema calvatum L.Bolus
- Trichodiadema densum Schwantes
- Trichodiadema emarginatum L.Bolus
- Trichodiadema fergusoniae L.Bolus
- Trichodiadema fourcadei L.Bolus
- Trichodiadema gracile L.Bolus
- Trichodiadema hallii L.Bolus
- Trichodiadema hirsutum (Haw.) Stearn
- Trichodiadema imitans L.Bolus
- Trichodiadema intonsum Schwantes
- Trichodiadema introrsum (Hook. f.) Niesler
- Trichodiadema littlewoodii L.Bolus
- Trichodiadema marlothii L.Bolus
- Trichodiadema mirabile Schwantes
- Trichodiadema obliquum L.Bolus
- Trichodiadema occidentale L.Bolus
- Trichodiadema olivaceum L.Bolus
- Trichodiadema orientale L.Bolus
- Trichodiadema peersii L.Bolus
- Trichodiadema pomeridianum L.Bolus
- Trichodiadema pygmaeum L.Bolus
- Trichodiadema rogersiae L.Bolus
- Trichodiadema rupicola L.Bolus
- Trichodiadema ryderae L.Bolus
- Trichodiadema setuliferum Schwantes
- Trichodiadema stayneri L.Bolus
- Trichodiadema strumosum L.Bolus
