= Trichodiadema attonsum =

Scientific classification
- Kingdom: Plantae
- Clade: Tracheophytes
- Clade: Angiosperms
- Clade: Eudicots
- Order: Caryophyllales
- Family: Aizoaceae
- Genus: Trichodiadema
- Species: T. attonsum

Binomial name
- Trichodiadema attonsum (L.Bolus) Schwantes

Species of succulent

Trichodiadema attonsum is succulent plant of the genus Trichodiadema, native to the Western Cape Province, South Africa, where it is common among pale quartzite rocks in the western Little Karoo region. Unlike most other species in its genus, it does not have a typical diadem on its leaf-tips.

== Description ==
A small, erect shrub, up to 15 cm tall. The leaves are papillate, and are not tipped with clear diadems, unlike most of the other species of its genus. Instead, the concolorous papillae near the tip are just slightly elongated.

The flowers are white, with petals in three series, and with filamentous staminodes at the centre. The flower stalks have especially long papillae.

The fruit capsule has five locules (sometimes four), each with well-developed covering membranes and thinning expanded keels.
