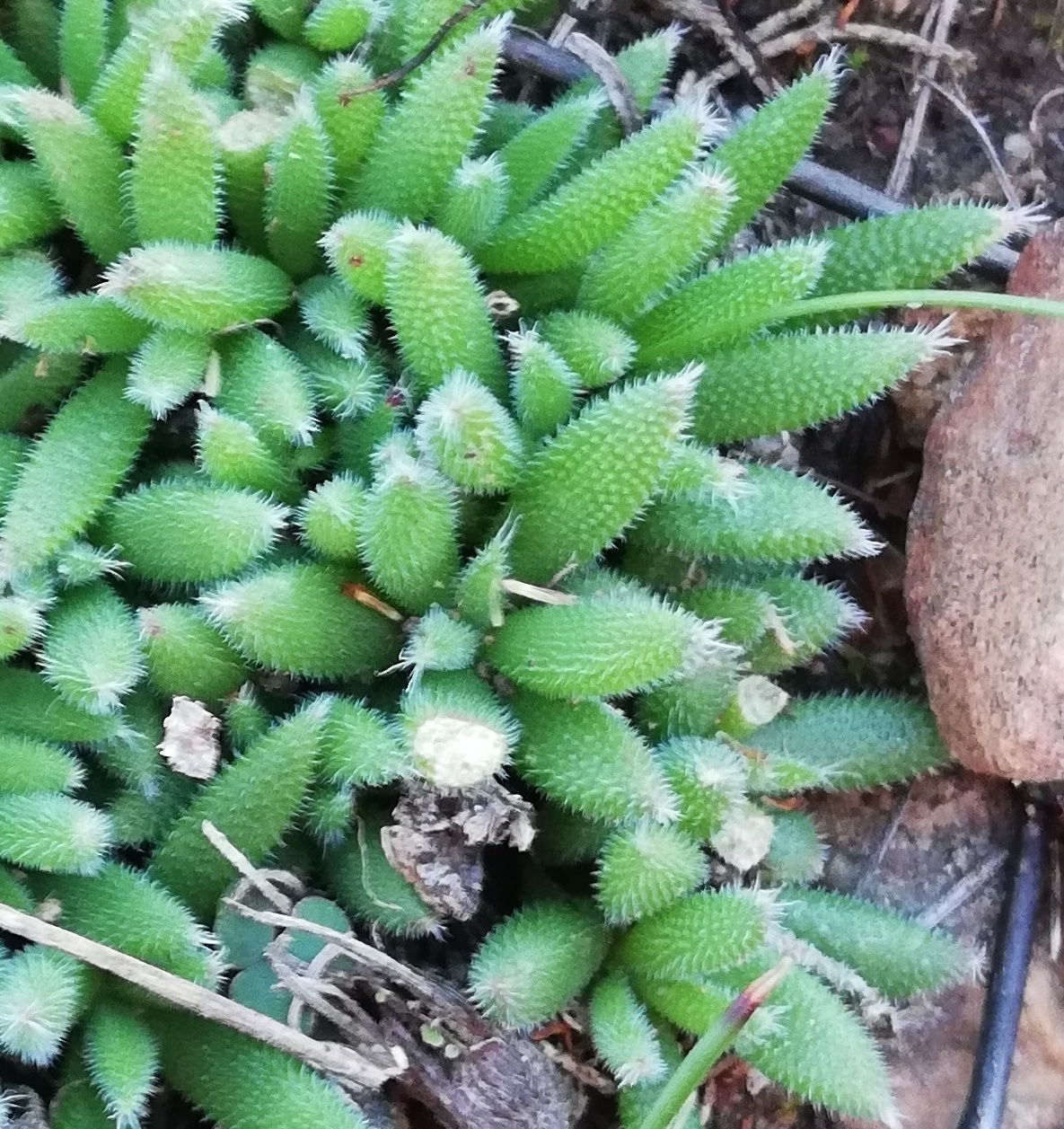
- Leaves of Trichodiadema pygmaeum

Scientific classification
- Kingdom: Plantae
- Clade: Tracheophytes
- Clade: Angiosperms
- Clade: Eudicots
- Order: Caryophyllales
- Family: Aizoaceae
- Genus: Trichodiadema
- Species: T. pygmaeum

Binomial name
- Trichodiadema pygmaeum L.Bolus

= Trichodiadema pygmaeum =

Species of succulent

Trichodiadema pygmaeum is succulent plant of the genus Trichodiadema, native to the Western Cape Province, South Africa, where it is found in fine-grained soils in the regions of Bredasdorp and Swellendam.

This mat-forming species is one of the few species in the genus that do not have the typical leaf-tip diadems. It is also one of three species that have leaves covered in dense hairs (together with T.fergusoniae and T.strumosum)

== Description ==
A small, spreading, mat-forming plant, with the branches rooting and spreading along the ground. A central tuberous taproot remains in the centre of the mat, where the original plant first matured.

The leaves are 6–10 mm by 3 mm, and covered entirely in very dense, long hairs. Some of the cells at the leaf-tip are orange in colour. It is therefore without the leaf-tip diadems that are typical for the genus.

The flowers are apricot coloured, each petal with a darker purple central stripe. The stamens form a low central cone surrounded by filamentous staminodes.

=== Related species ===
It can sometimes be confused with the other two hairy-leafed species of the genus, T.fergusoniae and T.strumosum. However the latter two species do not form mats of branches that root adventitiously, and they both have longer and thinner leaves (usually about 12 mm x 2 mm).

== Distribution and habitat ==
This threatened species is restricted to shallow rocky soils in quartz outcrops, within shale and silcrete renosterveld vegetation.

It occurs from near Swellendam in the west, to as far east as the lower Breede River and Cape Infanta.
