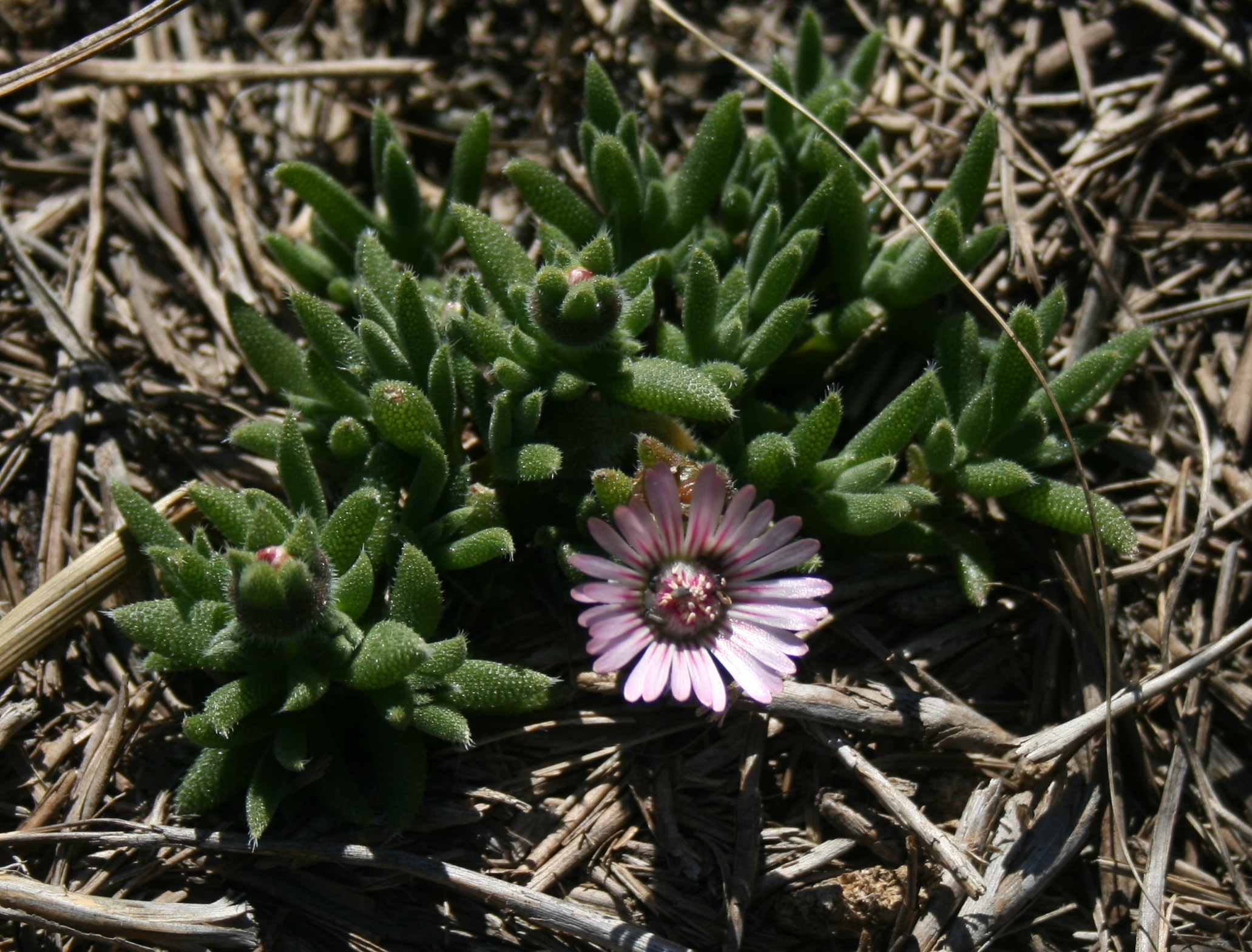
- Trichodiadema occidentale growing near the town of Napier.

Scientific classification
- Kingdom: Plantae
- Clade: Tracheophytes
- Clade: Angiosperms
- Clade: Eudicots
- Order: Caryophyllales
- Family: Aizoaceae
- Genus: Trichodiadema
- Species: T. occidentale

Binomial name
- Trichodiadema occidentale L.Bolus

= Trichodiadema occidentale =

Species of succulent

Trichodiadema occidentale is succulent plant of the genus Trichodiadema, native to the Western Cape Province, South Africa, where it grows in rocky shale or limestone hills in the Overberg region, and especially in disturbed areas.

It occurs throughout the Overberg region, from Caledon in the west, south to Agulhas and Bredasdorp, and eastwards to Swellendam and Riversdale.

== Description ==
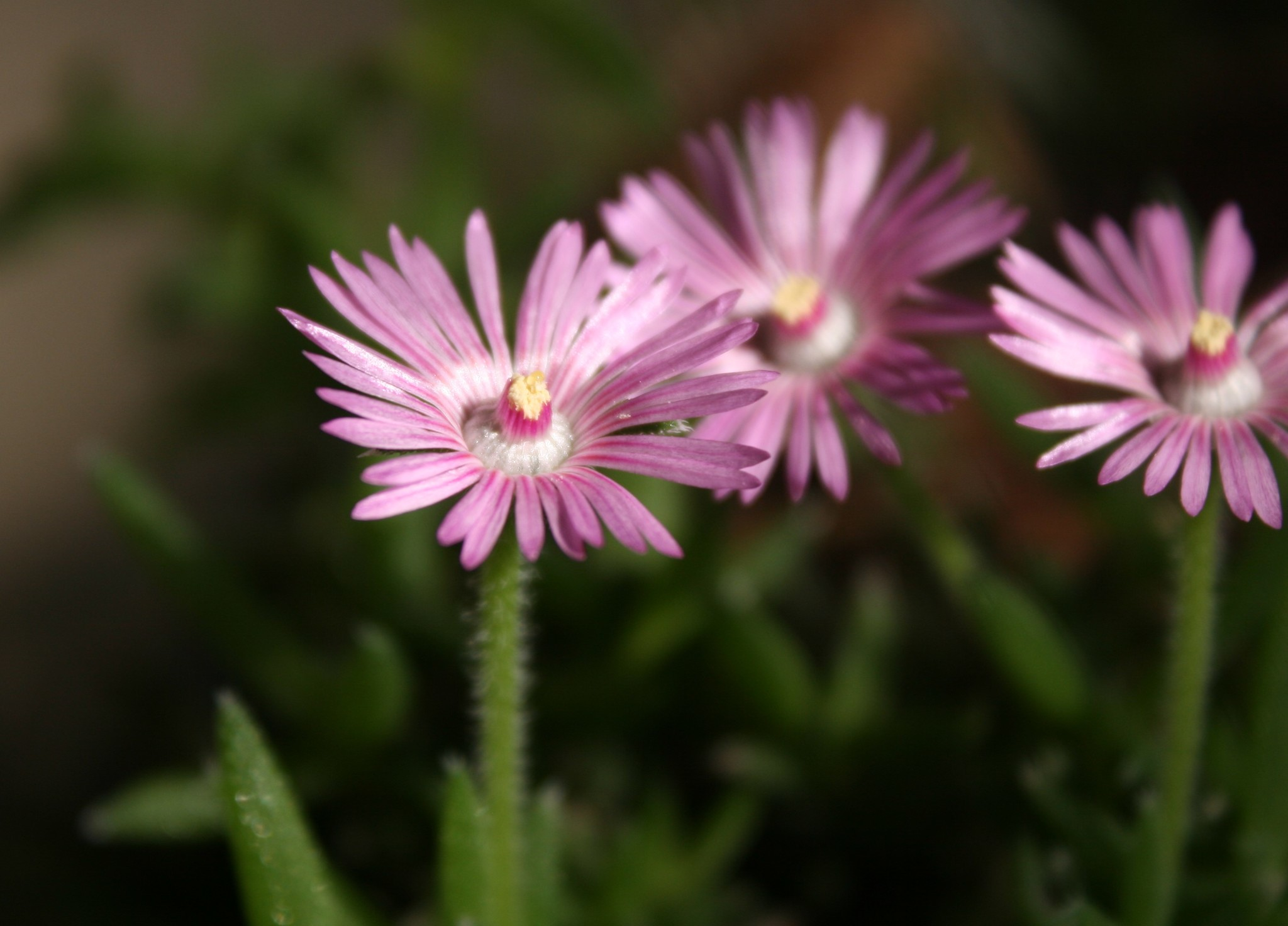
Flower detail of Trichodiadema occidentale.

A small succulent shrub, with spreading stems ending in erect branches, eventually forming a mat. The internodes are very short. The base is a thick tuberous taproot of various shapes.

The leaves have waxy bladder cells, and are tipped with a few short, pale hairs.

The flowers are pale apricot to pink coloured, each petal with a darker purple central stripe. The stamens form a low central cone surrounded by filamentous staminodes.
