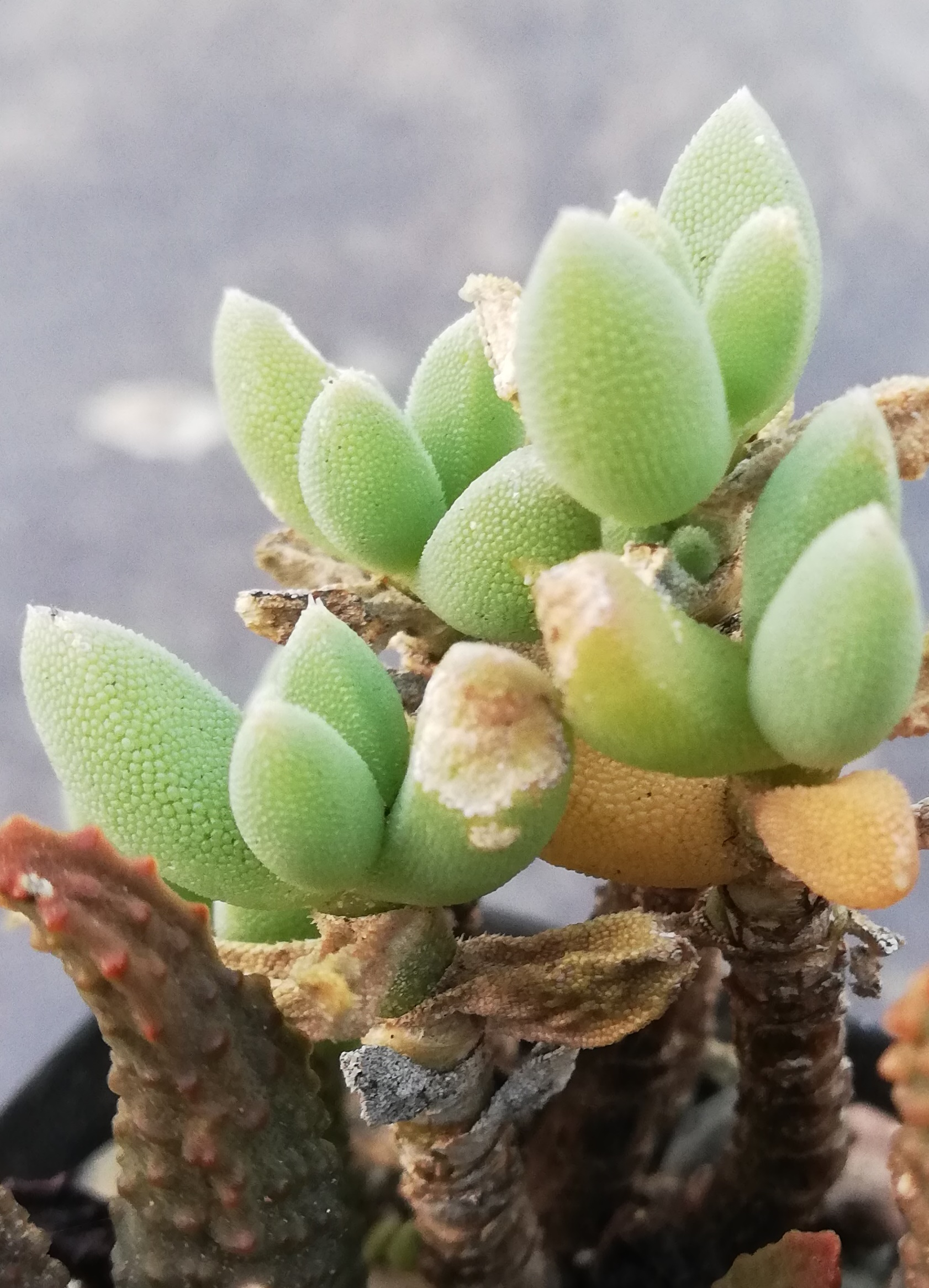
- A very compact specimen of Trichodiadema calvatum.

Scientific classification
- Kingdom: Plantae
- Clade: Tracheophytes
- Clade: Angiosperms
- Clade: Eudicots
- Order: Caryophyllales
- Family: Aizoaceae
- Genus: Trichodiadema
- Species: T. calvatum

Binomial name
- Trichodiadema calvatum L.Bolus

= Trichodiadema calvatum =

Species of succulent

Trichodiadema calvatum is succulent plant of the genus Trichodiadema, native to the Western Cape Province, South Africa, where it is found in shales, in open rocky areas within Renosterveld vegetation.

It occurs in the regions of Robertson, Montagu, Caledon and Swellendam.

== Description ==
A small, erect plant, with a thick trunk-like taproot that is widest at the top. The branches are usually gracile, with long, slender internodes (10–15 mm).

The leaves have prominent papillate epidermal cells all over their surface, and the leaf-tips have several slightly elongated bladder cells, extending at various levels. It is therefore without the leaf-tip diadems that are typical for the genus.

The solitary flowers are purple or deep pink, with a low central cone (later opening into a tube) and without filamentous staminodes.
