= Trichodiadema rogersiae =

Scientific classification
- Kingdom: Plantae
- Clade: Tracheophytes
- Clade: Angiosperms
- Clade: Eudicots
- Order: Caryophyllales
- Family: Aizoaceae
- Genus: Trichodiadema
- Species: T. rogersiae

Binomial name
- Trichodiadema rogersiae L.Bolus

Species of succulent

Trichodiadema rogersiae is a succulent plant of the genus Trichodiadema, indigenous to arid areas of the Eastern Cape Province, South Africa.
