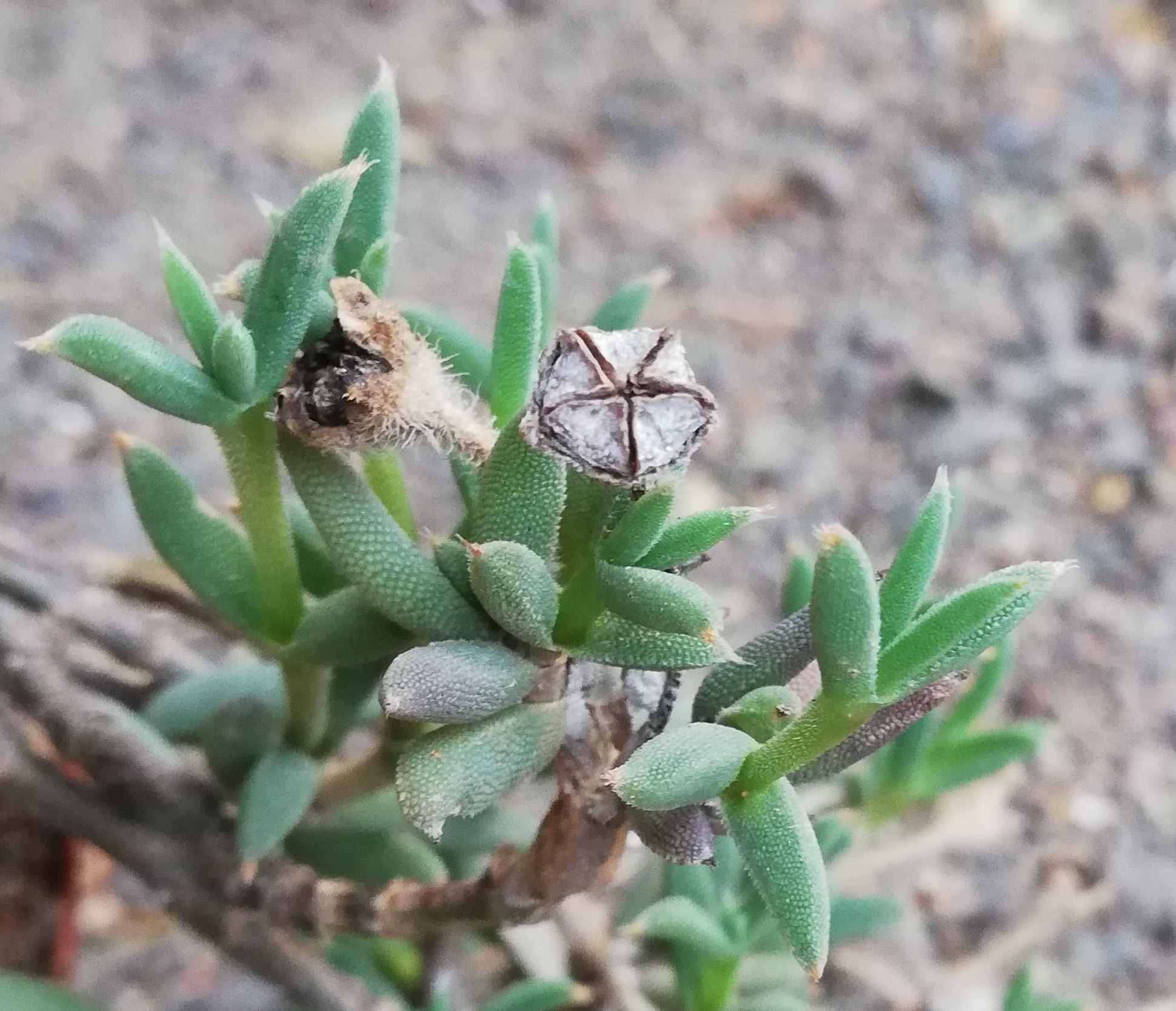

Scientific classification
- Kingdom: Plantae
- Clade: Tracheophytes
- Clade: Angiosperms
- Clade: Eudicots
- Order: Caryophyllales
- Family: Aizoaceae
- Genus: Trichodiadema
- Species: T. gracile

Binomial name
- Trichodiadema gracile L.Bolus

= Trichodiadema gracile =

Species of succulent

Trichodiadema gracile is succulent plant of the genus Trichodiadema, native to the Western Cape Province, South Africa, where it is common on dry, rocky hillsides in the Overberg region.

It occurs in the regions of Caledon, Bredasdorp, Potberg and Swellendam.

== Description ==
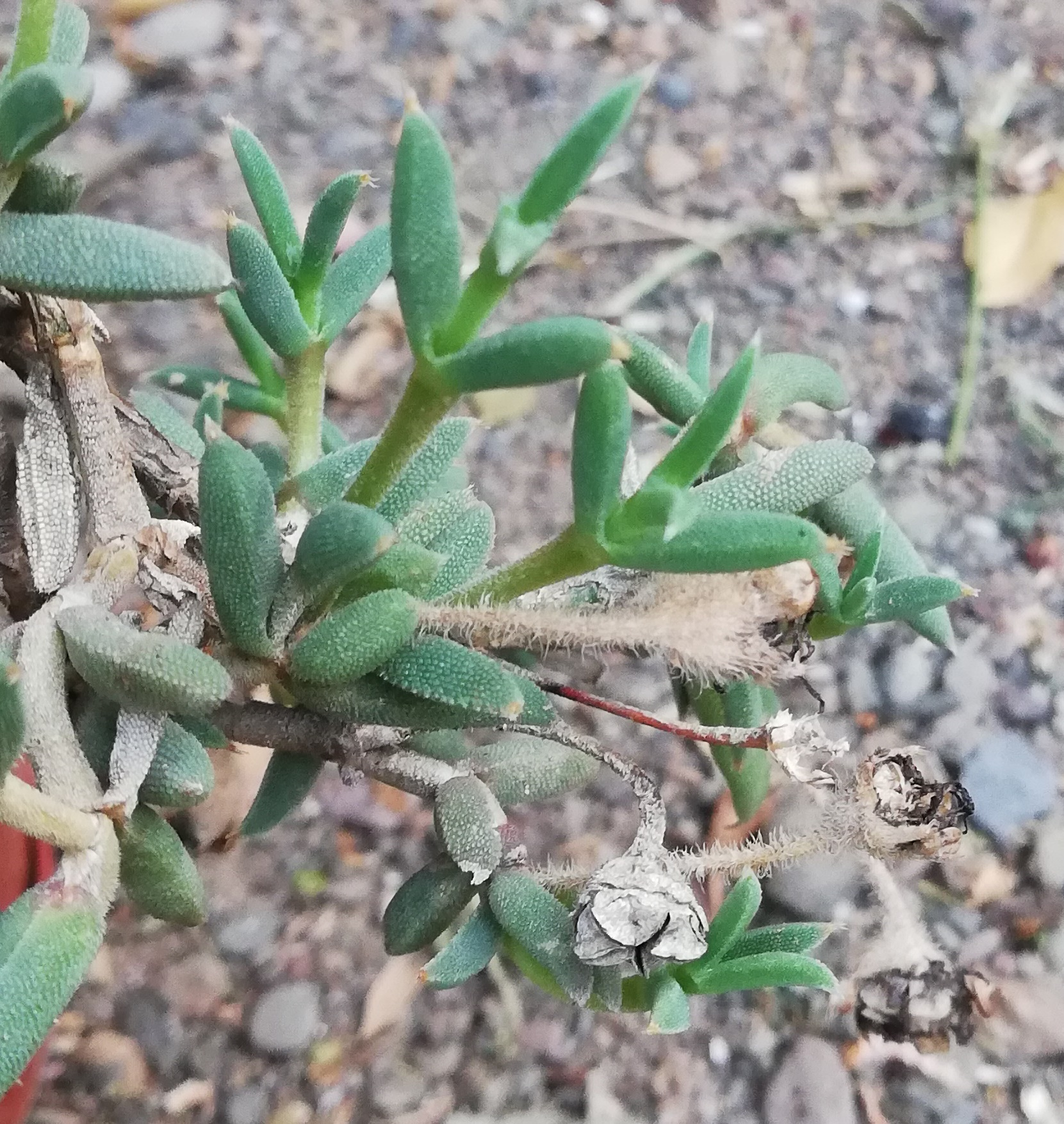
The gracile stems and long internodes of T.gracile, with leaves that do not have the prominent Trichodiadema diadems

A small shrub, with several trailing stems (20 cm). The branches are gracile and spindly, with long, slender internodes (10–15 mm).

The leaves are papillate, and the orange leaf-tips have several slightly elongated bladder cells, extending at various levels. Therefore, although it has several elongated orange papillae at the leaf tip, this species is without the normal diadem that is typical for the genus.

The solitary flowers are pink to apricot, with a low central cone surrounded by purple filamentous staminodes that are as long as the stamens.
