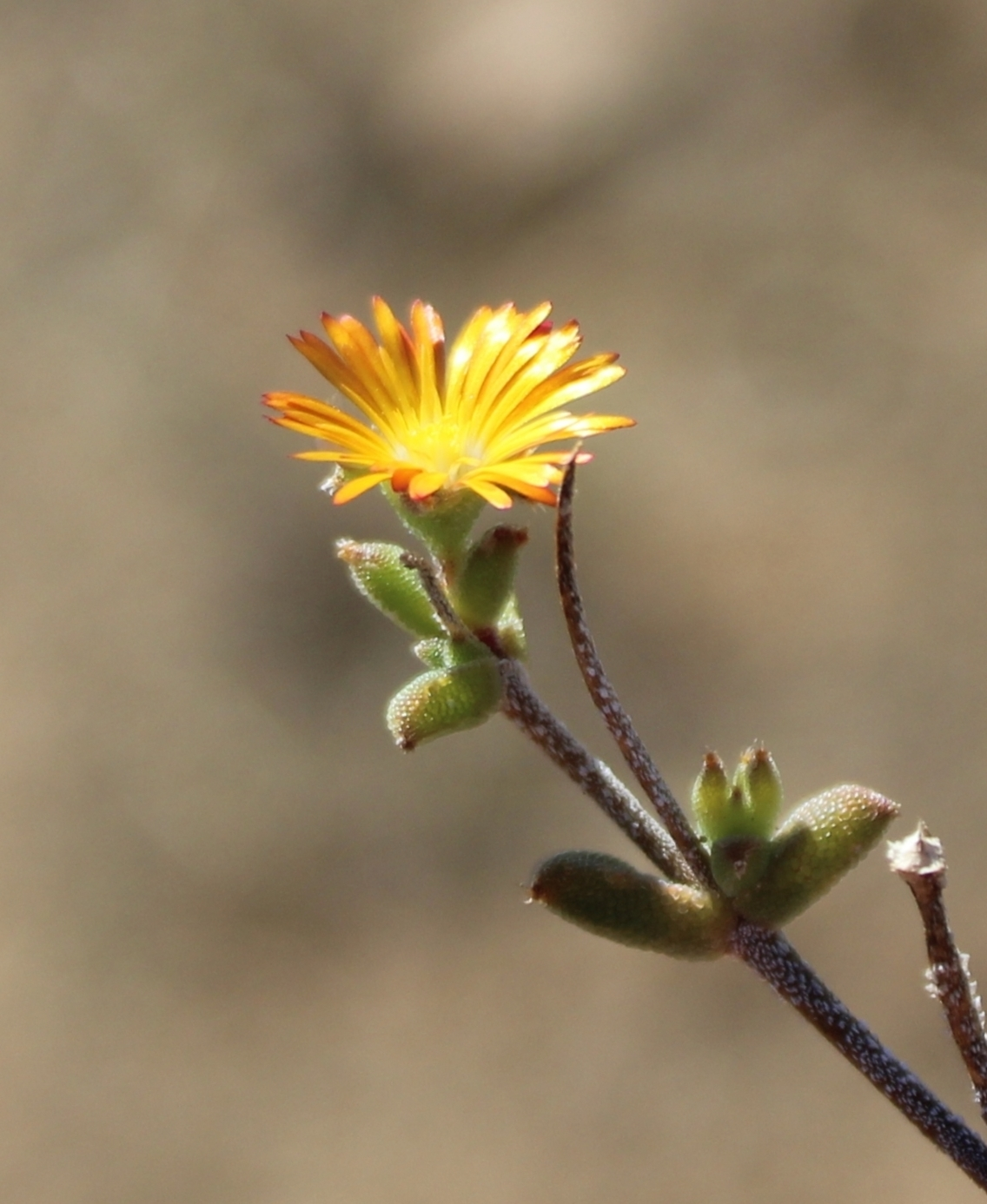

Scientific classification
- Kingdom: Plantae
- Clade: Tracheophytes
- Clade: Angiosperms
- Clade: Eudicots
- Order: Caryophyllales
- Family: Aizoaceae
- Genus: Trichodiadema
- Species: T. introrsum

Binomial name
- Trichodiadema introrsum (Hook.f.) Niesler

Synonyms
- Mesembryanthemum introrsum Hook.f.

= Trichodiadema introrsum =

Species of succulent

Trichodiadema introrsum is succulent plant of the genus Trichodiadema, native to the Eastern Cape Province, South Africa. It occurs in the vicinity of the towns of Bedford, Grahamstown and Kirkwood.

The species grows as a slender shrublet, with yellow flowers and slightly recurved semi-terete leaves, each with a small, simple, white apical diadem of bristles. Its stems are covered in tiny white papillae, giving them a slightly rough texture.
