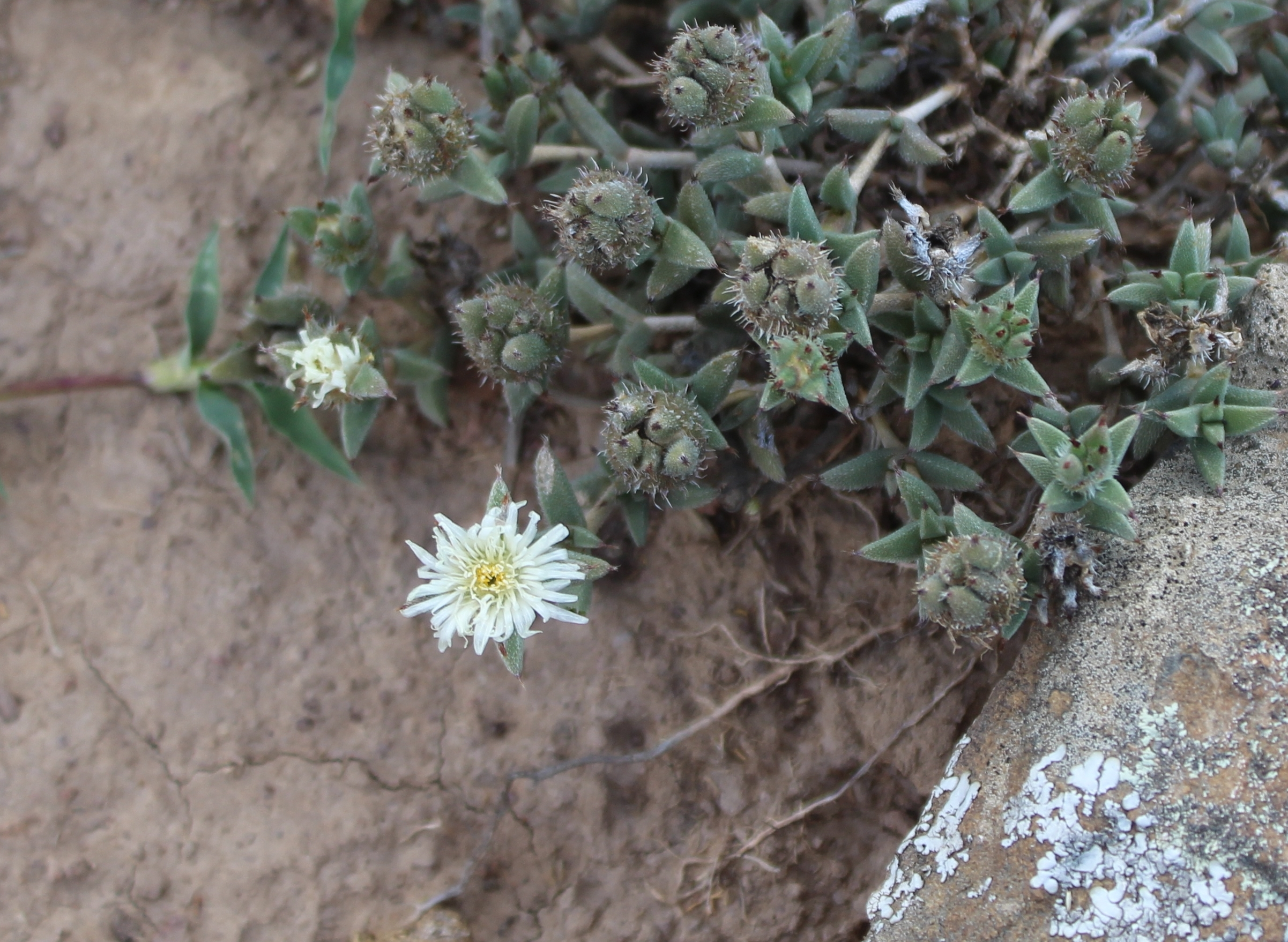

Scientific classification
- Kingdom: Plantae
- Clade: Tracheophytes
- Clade: Angiosperms
- Clade: Eudicots
- Order: Caryophyllales
- Family: Aizoaceae
- Genus: Trichodiadema
- Species: T. orientale

Binomial name
- Trichodiadema orientale L.Bolus

= Trichodiadema orientale =

Species of succulent

Trichodiadema orientale is a succulent plant of the genus Trichodiadema, widespread in the arid areas of the Eastern Cape Province, South Africa.
