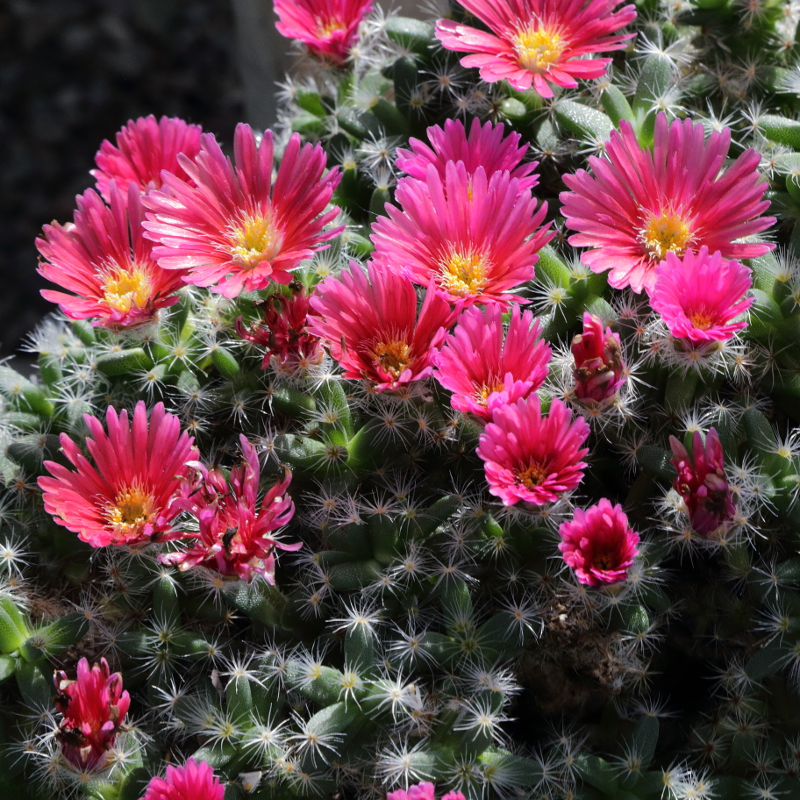

Scientific classification
- Kingdom: Plantae
- Clade: Tracheophytes
- Clade: Angiosperms
- Clade: Eudicots
- Order: Caryophyllales
- Family: Aizoaceae
- Genus: Trichodiadema
- Species: T. densum

Binomial name
- Trichodiadema densum Schwantes

= Trichodiadema densum =

Species of succulent

Trichodiadema densum is a succulent flowering plant in the fig-marigold family Aizoaceae, native to the Willowmore region of the Western Cape Province, South Africa.

== Description ==
It is a small, dense, compact, clumping shrub. The leaves are packed densely along the stems (the internodes are scarcely visible) and each leaf is tipped with a diadem of ca. 20 white radiating bristles.

The flowers are reddish in colour, with filamentous staminodes at the centre.

The pale fruit capsule has six locules (not five like T. burgeri), each with very well developed covering membranes.

This species very closely resembles Trichodiadema burgeri, which is more elongated and has five locules.

Trichodiadema densum has received the Royal Horticultural Society's Award of Garden Merit.
