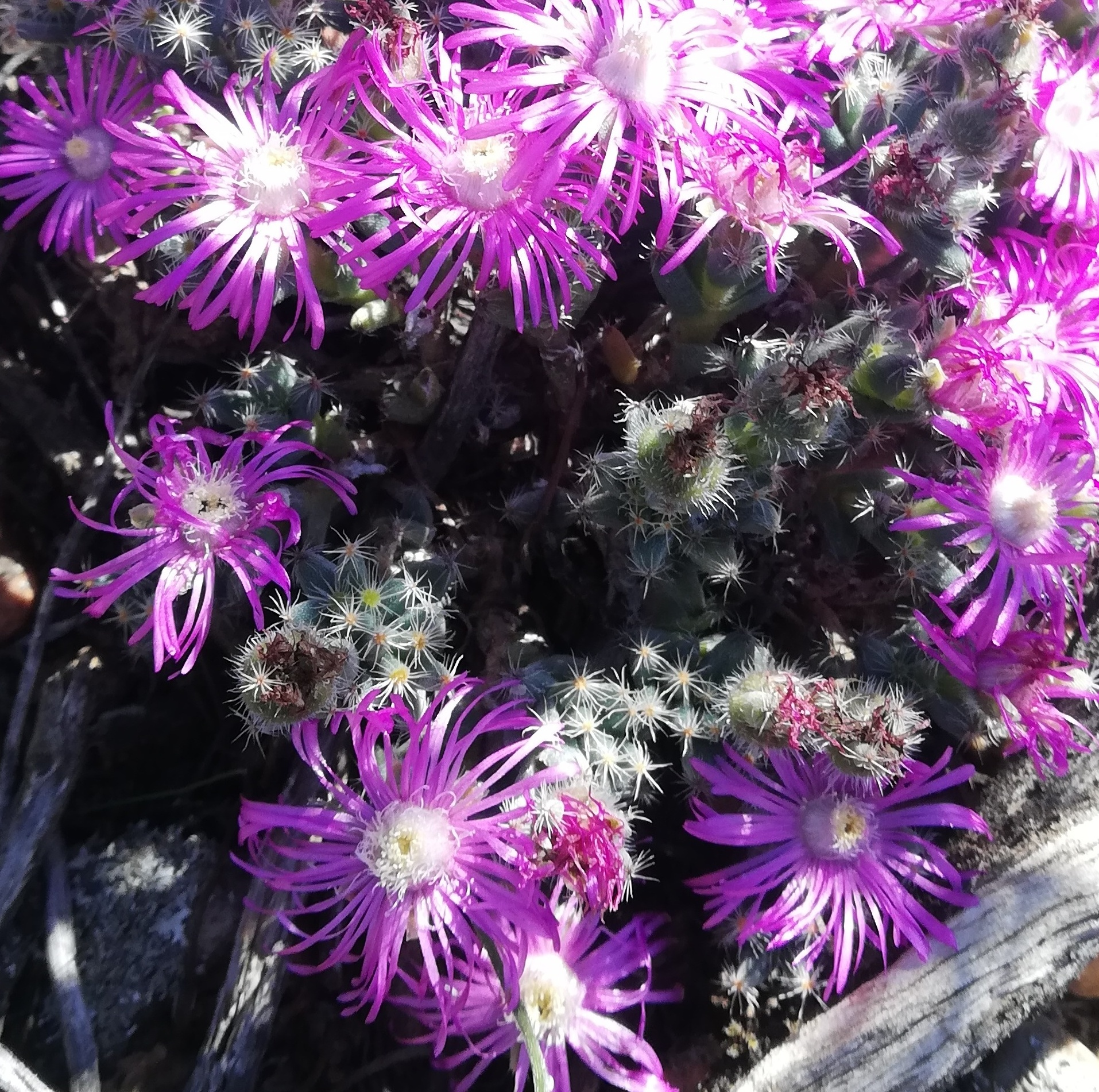
- Trichodiadema marlothii in flower

Scientific classification
- Kingdom: Plantae
- Clade: Tracheophytes
- Clade: Angiosperms
- Clade: Eudicots
- Order: Caryophyllales
- Family: Aizoaceae
- Genus: Trichodiadema
- Species: T. marlothii

Binomial name
- Trichodiadema marlothii L.Bolus

= Trichodiadema marlothii =

Species of succulent

Trichodiadema marlothii is succulent plant of the genus Trichodiadema, native to the Western Cape Province, South Africa, where it is known from the Robertson and Swellendam areas.

== Description ==
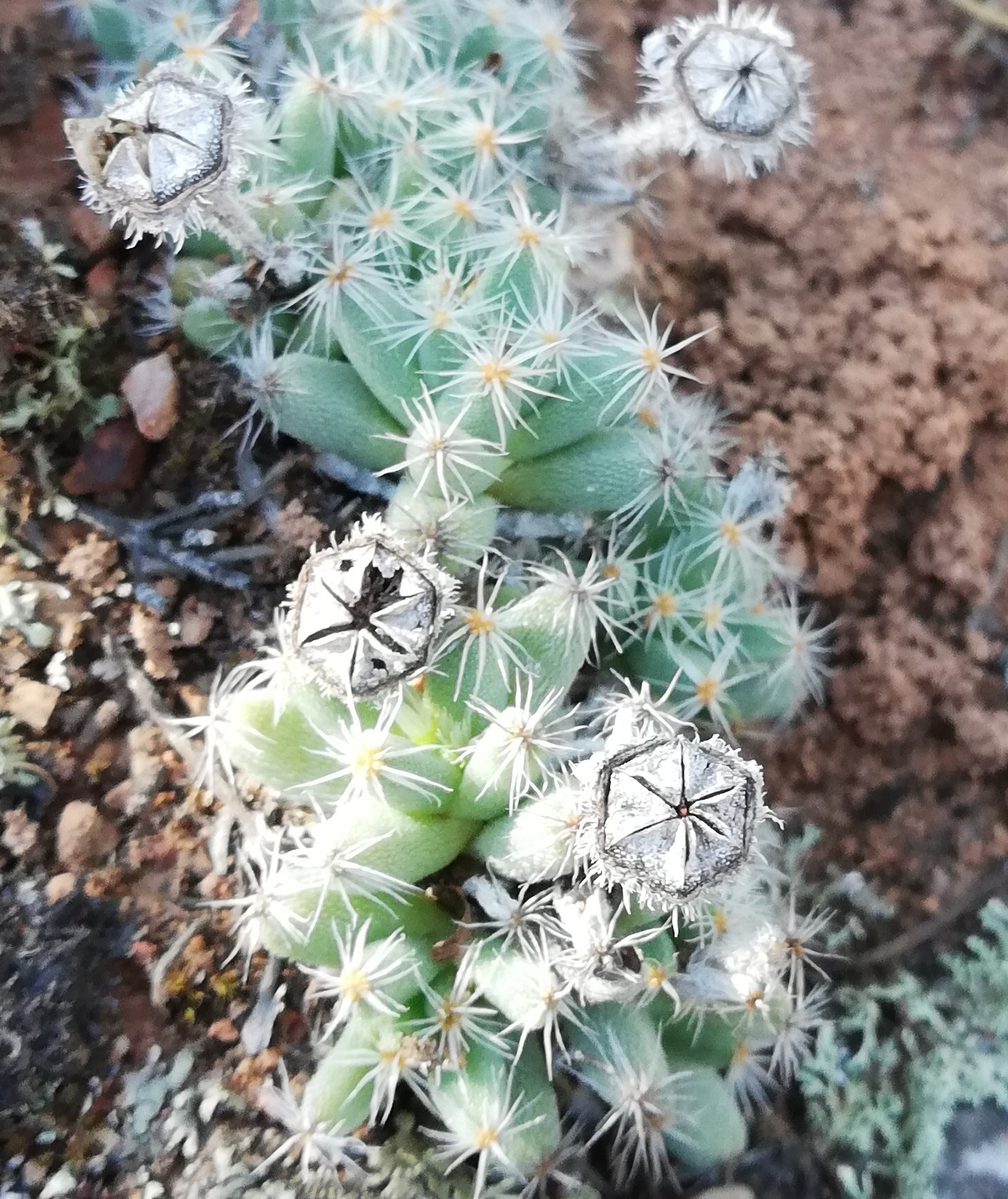
Leaves and fruit capsules of Trichodiadema marlothii, growing near Ashton.

A small, semi-decumbent shrub, usually about 4 cm tall. The internodes are not visible on the stems.

The leaves are papillate and each is tipped with 5-10 large, white, radiating bristles (diadems), that are parted and spread out in two directions. The centre-point of the diadem is brown.

The flowers are dark pink in colour, with filamentous staminodes at the centre that have pink tips and pale bases. The petals are sometimes slightly emarginate. The flower stalk and base are covered in brown hairs.

The fruit capsule has six locules, each with very well developed covering membranes.

== Related species ==
This species very closely resembles Trichodiadema hirsutum, which differs only in having a larger number of bristles, 20(-40), on its leaf tips.

This species also somewhat resembles Trichodiadema emarginatum, which however has five locules, an even lower growth-habit and petals that are emarginate.
