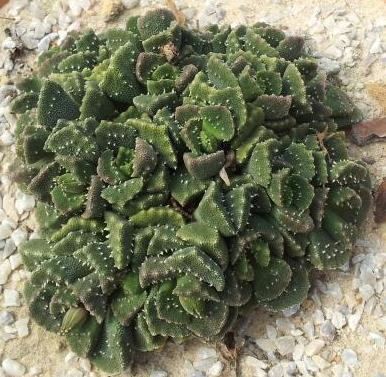
- Aloinopsis luckhoffii in cultivation

Scientific classification
- Kingdom: Plantae
- Clade: Tracheophytes
- Clade: Angiosperms
- Clade: Eudicots
- Order: Caryophyllales
- Family: Aizoaceae
- Subfamily: Ruschioideae
- Tribe: Ruschieae
- Genus: Aloinopsis; Schwantes

Species
- See text

Synonyms
- Acaulon N.E.Br.; Aistocaulon Poelln. ex H.Jacobsen

= Aloinopsis =

Genus of succulents

Aloinopsis is a genus of ice plants native to the Cape Provinces of South Africa.

== Description ==
This genus is closely related to the similar Titanopsis, Deilanthe and Nananthus genera. Aloinopsis species have a rather large tuberous root system, and are occasionally cultivated for their looks. They also tend to grow more "heads" when they are raised. Most Aloinopsis are winter growers and can react badly to too much water at the wrong time. Aloinopsis malherbei reportedly have "blunt tips to their leaves, which are densely covered with prominent white tubercles."

== Distribution ==
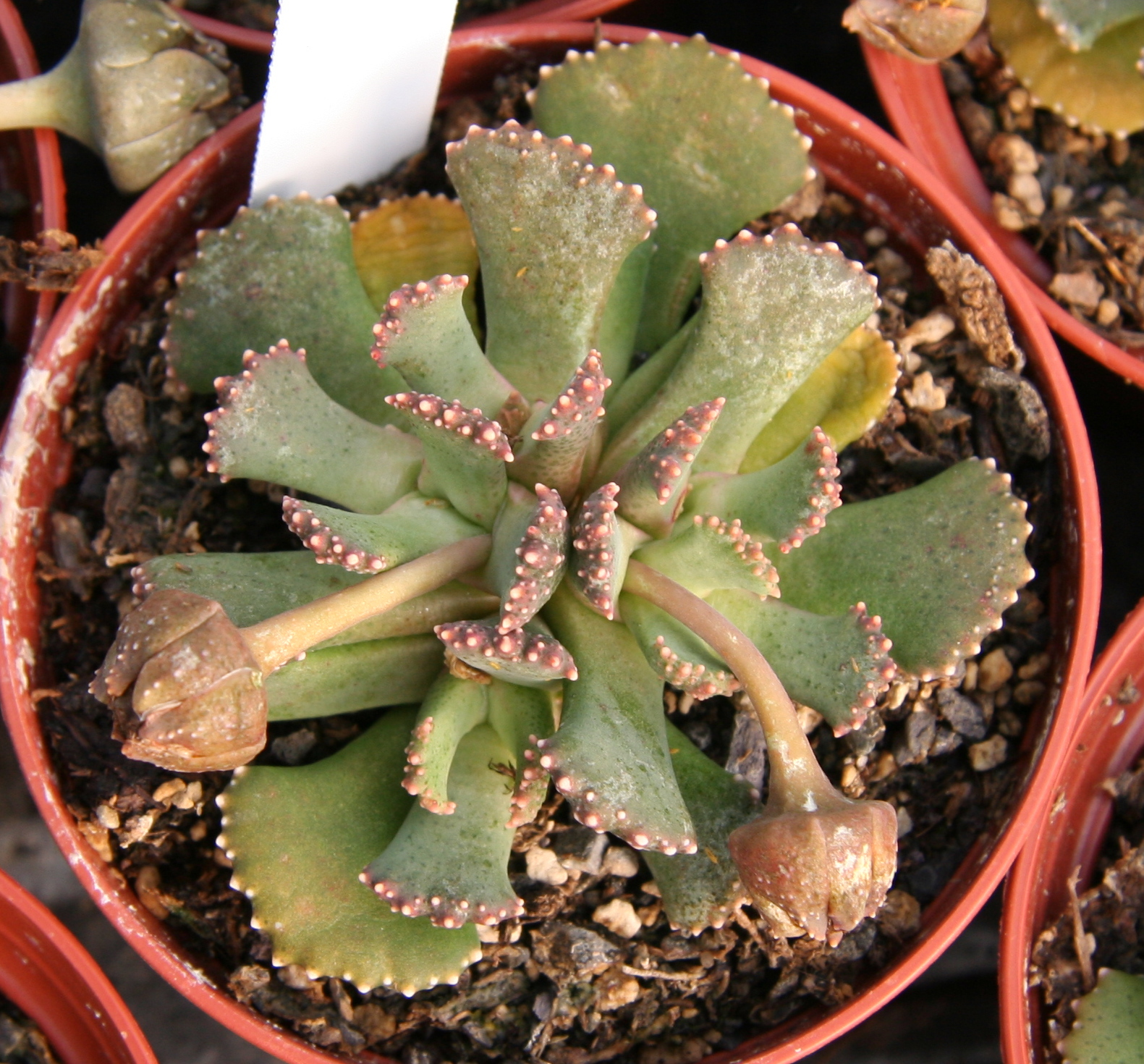
Aloinopsis malherbei

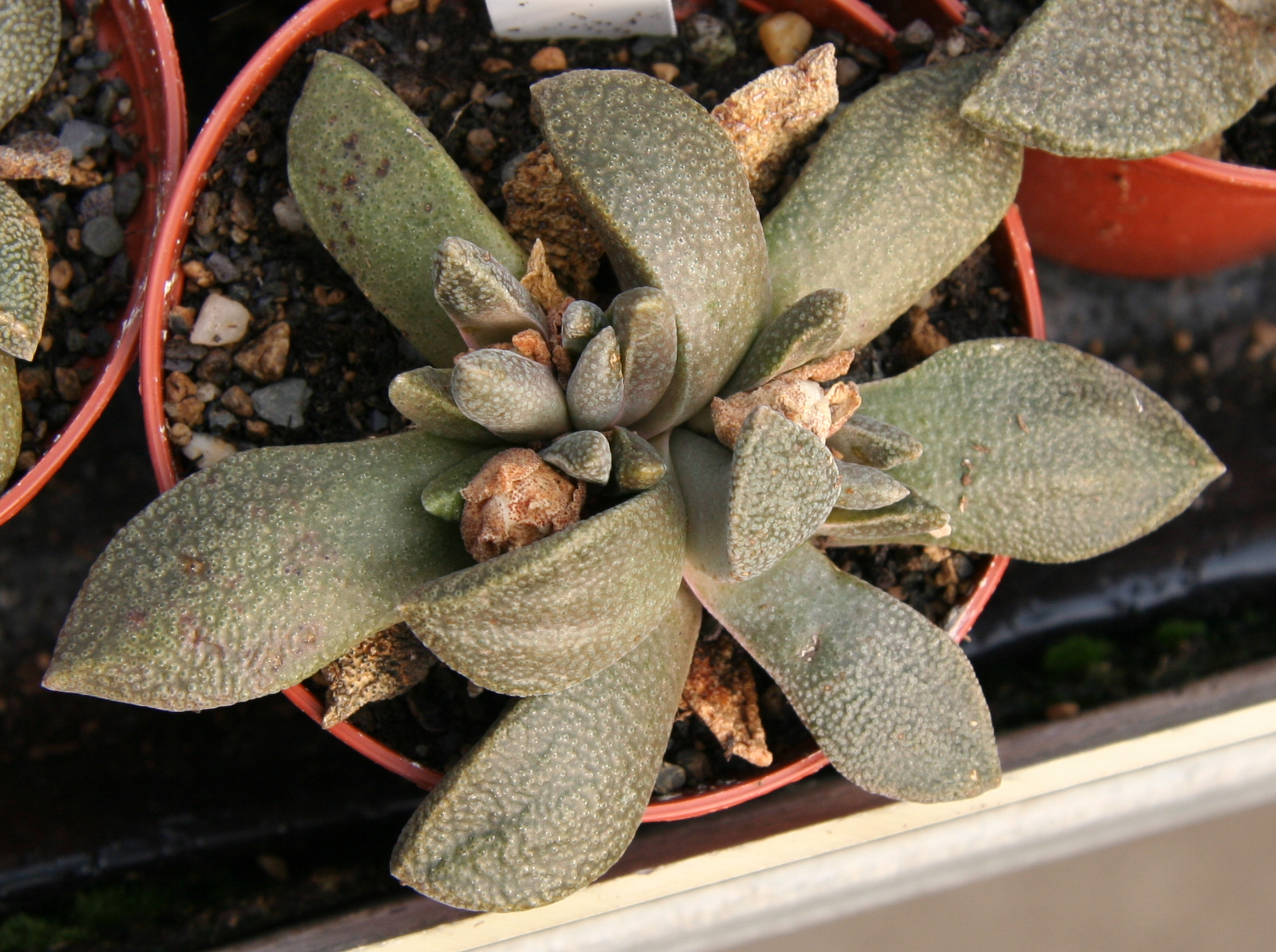
Aloinopsis rubrolineata

The species of Aloinopsis are indigenous to an arid area stretching across the border between the Western, Eastern and Northern Cape provinces of South Africa. Most species occur in an arid winter-rainfall area. An outlying species occurs in the far north eastern corner of the Northern Cape.

== Species ==
Eight species are accepted.

- Aloinopsis acuta L.Bolus
- Aloinopsis loganii L.Bolus
- Aloinopsis luckhoffii (L.Bolus) L.Bolus
- Aloinopsis malherbei (L.Bolus) L.Bolus – Giant jewel plant
- Aloinopsis rosulata (Kensit) Schwantes
- Aloinopsis rubrolineata (N.E.Br.) Schwantes
- Aloinopsis schooneesii L.Bolus
- Aloinopsis spathulata (Thunb.) L.Bolus

=== Formerly placed here ===
- Deilanthe hilmarii (L.Bolus) H.E.K.Hartmann (as Aloinopsis hilmarii (L.Bolus) L.Bolus)
- Deilanthe peersii (L.Bolus) N.E.Br. (as Aloinopsis peersii (L.Bolus) L.Bolus)
- Deilanthe thudichumii (L.Bolus) S.A.Hammer (as Aloinopsis thudichumii L.Bolus)
- Nananthus aloides (Haw.) Schwantes (as Aloinopsis aloides (Haw.) Schwantes)
- Nananthus vittatus (N.E.Br.) Schwantes (as Aloinopsis vittata (N.E.Br.) Schwantes)
- Prepodesma orpenii (N.E.Br.) N.E.Br. (as Aloinopsis orpenii (N.E.Br.) L.Bolus)
