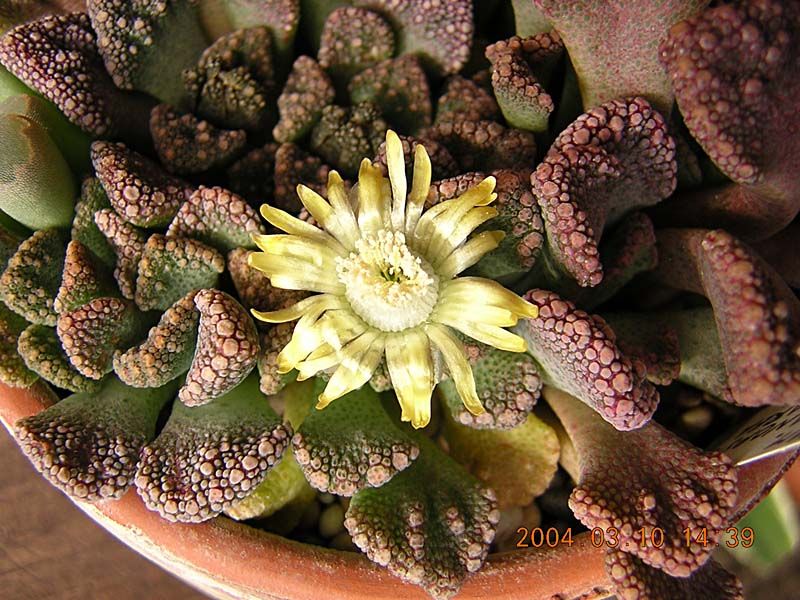
- In bloom

Scientific classification
- Kingdom: Plantae
- Clade: Embryophytes
- Clade: Tracheophytes
- Clade: Angiosperms
- Clade: Eudicots
- Order: Caryophyllales
- Family: Aizoaceae
- Genus: Titanopsis
- Species: T. calcarea

Binomial name
- Titanopsis calcarea (Marloth) Schwantes

Synonyms
- Mesembryanthemum calcareum Marloth; Titanopsis fulleri Tischer ex H.Jacobsen

= Titanopsis calcarea =

Species of flowering plant

Titanopsis calcarea, commonly called the jewel plant, is a species of ice plant (family Aizoaceae) in the genus Titanopsis, native to the Cape Provinces, Free State, and Northern Provinces of South Africa. A succulent, it has gained the Royal Horticultural Society's Award of Garden Merit as an ornamental. In nature usually only the tips of the leaves would rise above the sand or dust. The tip would be covered with white, gray or pink irregular dots, to match local pebbles.

German-South African botanist Rudolf Marloth described the species in 1926 as Mesembryanthemum calcareum, before Martin Heinrich Gustav Schwantes placed it in the genus Titanopsis.
