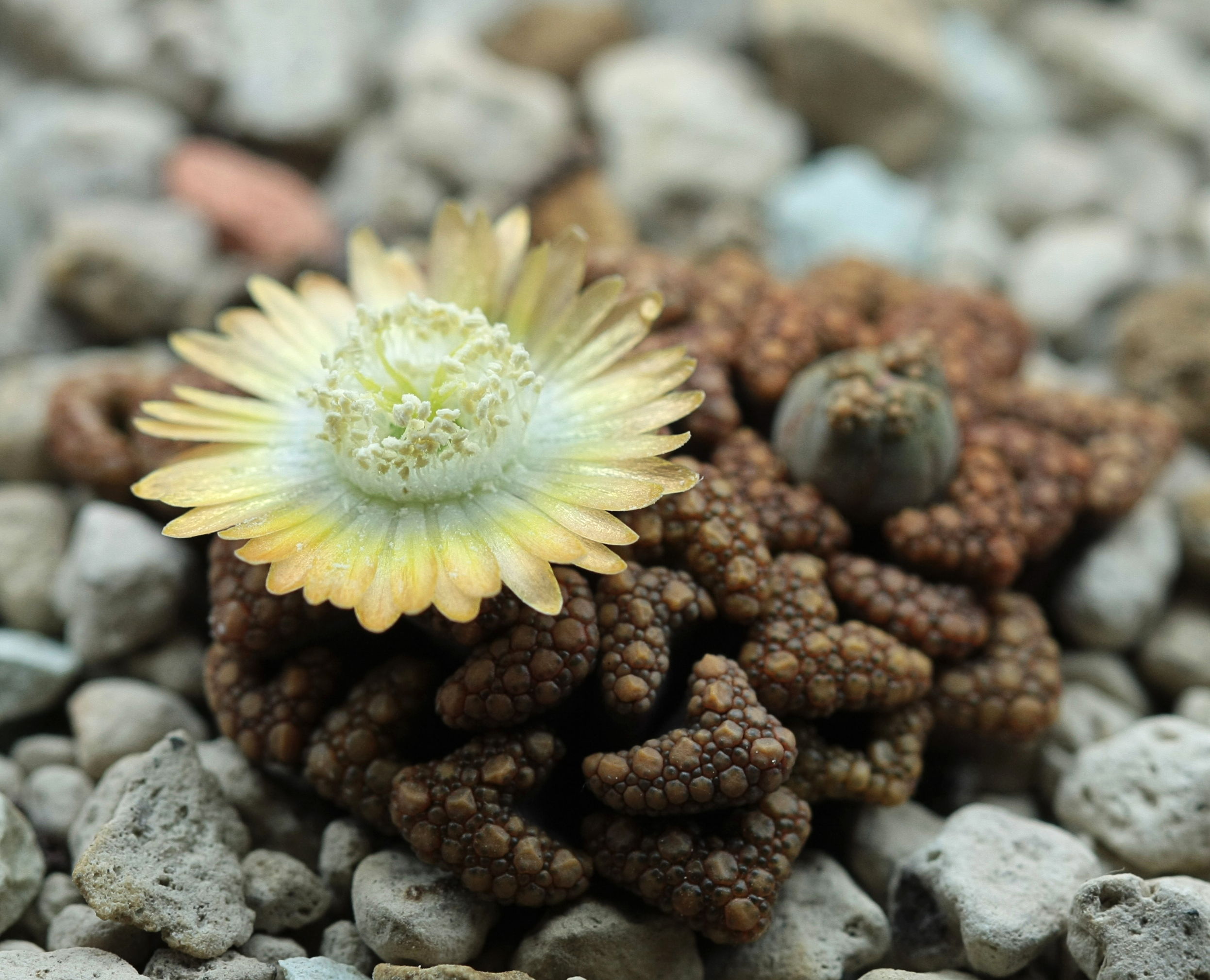
- In bloom
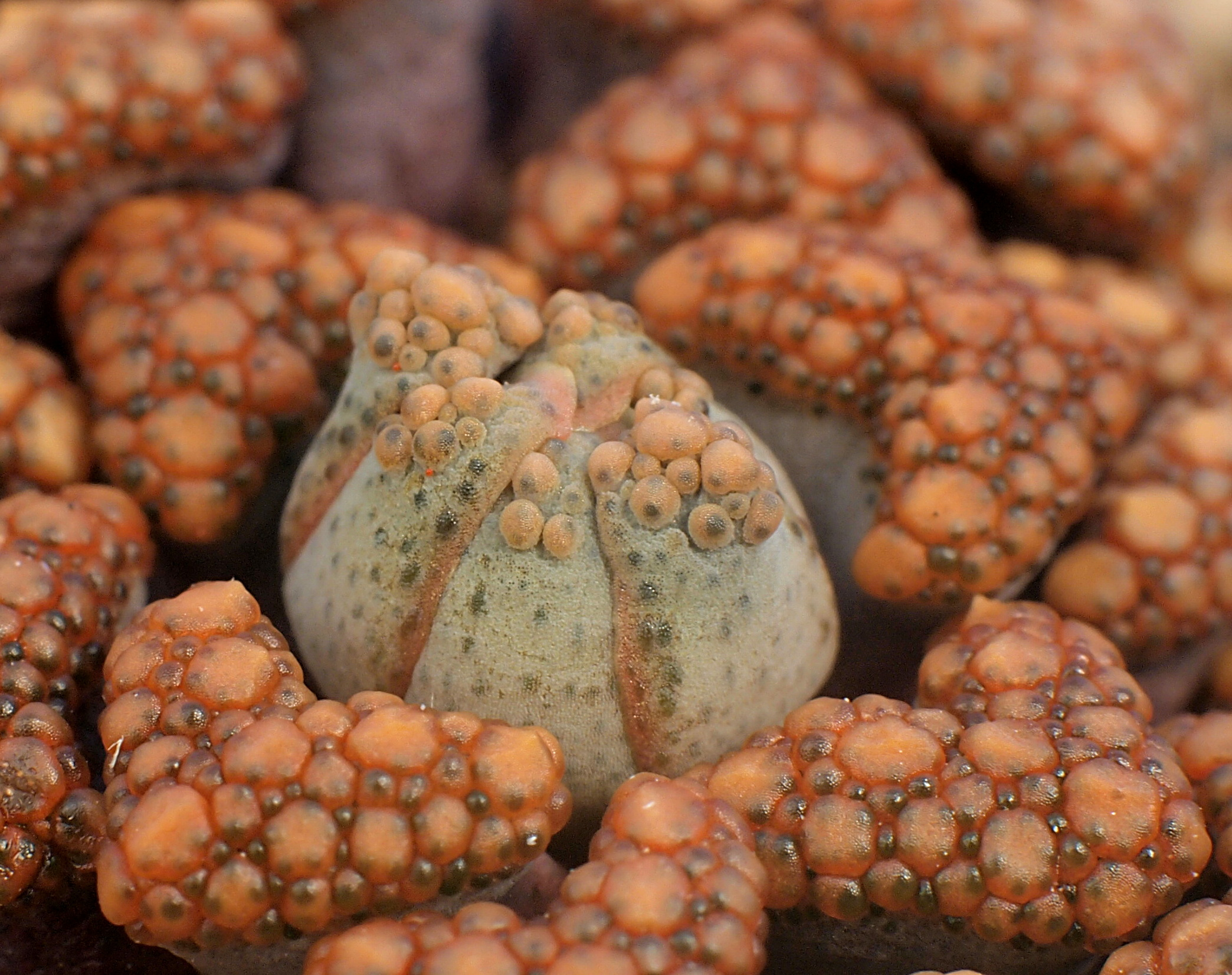
- Close up of pebbly leaf elaborations

Scientific classification
- Kingdom: Plantae
- Clade: Embryophytes
- Clade: Tracheophytes
- Clade: Angiosperms
- Clade: Eudicots
- Order: Caryophyllales
- Family: Aizoaceae
- Genus: Titanopsis
- Species: T. hugo-schlechteri

Binomial name
- Titanopsis hugo-schlechteri (Tischer) Dinter & Schwantes

Synonyms
- Mesembryanthemum hugo-schlechteri Tischer; Verrucifera hugo-schlechteri (Tischer) N.E.Br.

= Titanopsis hugo-schlechteri =

Species of flowering plant

Titanopsis hugo-schlechteri is a species of flowering plant in the family Aizoaceae, native to Namibia. A mat-forming succulent, it has gained the Royal Horticultural Society's Award of Garden Merit.
