= Nananthus margaritifer =

Scientific classification
- Kingdom: Plantae
- Clade: Tracheophytes
- Clade: Angiosperms
- Clade: Eudicots
- Order: Caryophyllales
- Family: Aizoaceae
- Genus: Nananthus
- Species: N. margaritifer

Binomial name
- Nananthus margaritifer L.Bolus

Species of succulent

Nananthus margaritifer is a perennial, succulent plant that is part of the Aizoaceae family. The species is native to Botswana, Namibia and South Africa. In South Africa, the plant occurs in the Northern Cape.
