= Nananthus pallens =

Scientific classification
- Kingdom: Plantae
- Clade: Tracheophytes
- Clade: Angiosperms
- Clade: Eudicots
- Order: Caryophyllales
- Family: Aizoaceae
- Genus: Nananthus
- Species: N. pallens

Binomial name
- Nananthus pallens (L.Bolus) L.Bolus

Synonyms
- Aloinopsis pallens L.Bolus

Species of succulent

Nananthus pallens is a perennial, succulent plant that is part of the Aizoaceae family. The species is endemic to South Africa and occurs in the Northern Cape.
