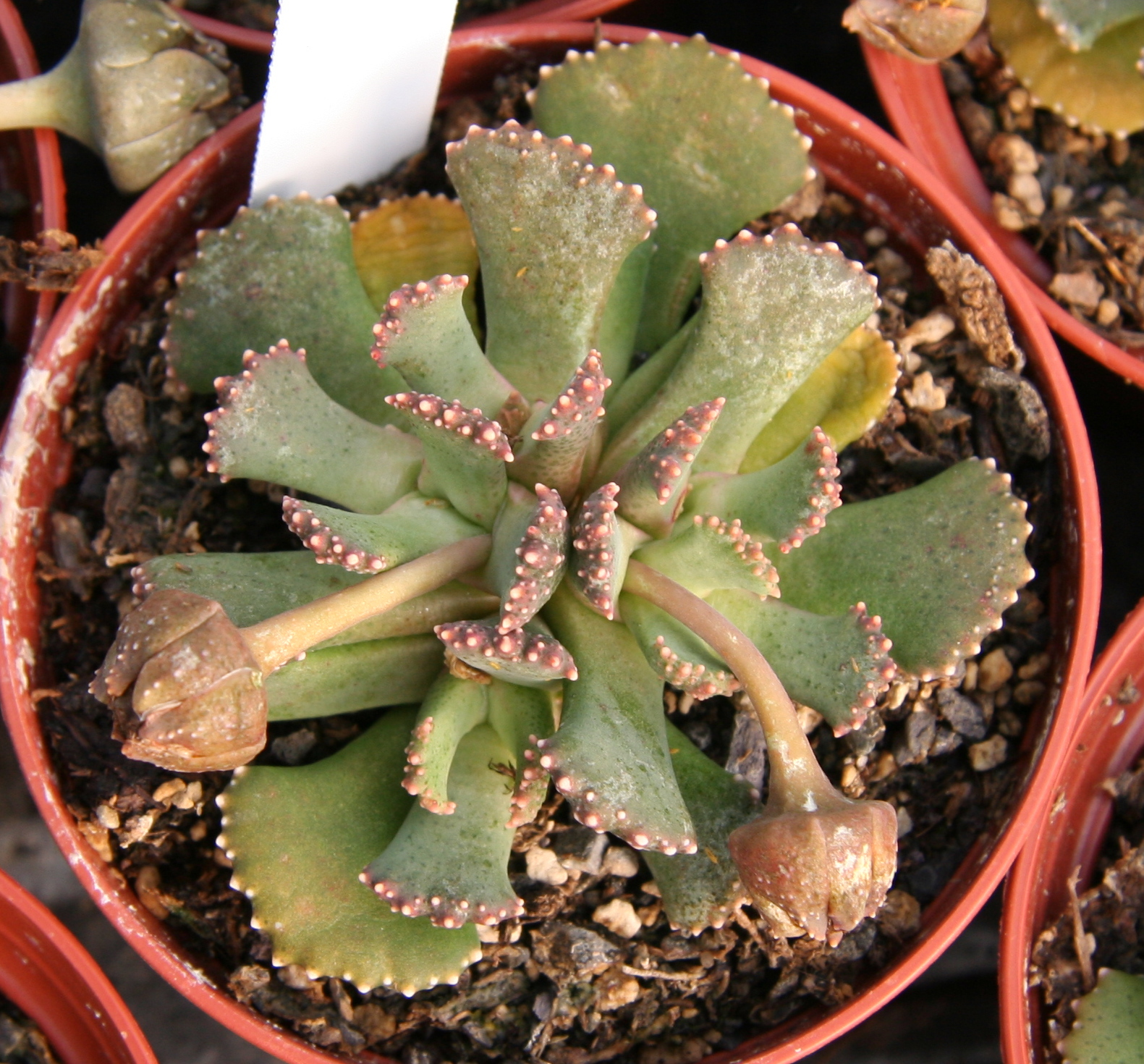

Scientific classification
- Kingdom: Plantae
- Clade: Tracheophytes
- Clade: Angiosperms
- Clade: Eudicots
- Order: Caryophyllales
- Family: Aizoaceae
- Genus: Aloinopsis
- Species: A. malherbei

Binomial name
- Aloinopsis malherbei (L.Bolus) L.Bolus

= Aloinopsis malherbei =

Species of succulent

Aloinopsis malherbei is a species of succulent plant, also known as the giant jewel plant. It is native to the Cape Provinces of South Africa, especially the area around Calvinia and Loeriesfontein. The plant produces a thick tuber and produces yellow flowers. Unlike other Aloinopsis, it only has tubercles (bumps) at the leaf tips.

It was named in honour of Marthinus Lourens Malherbe of Soekershof.
