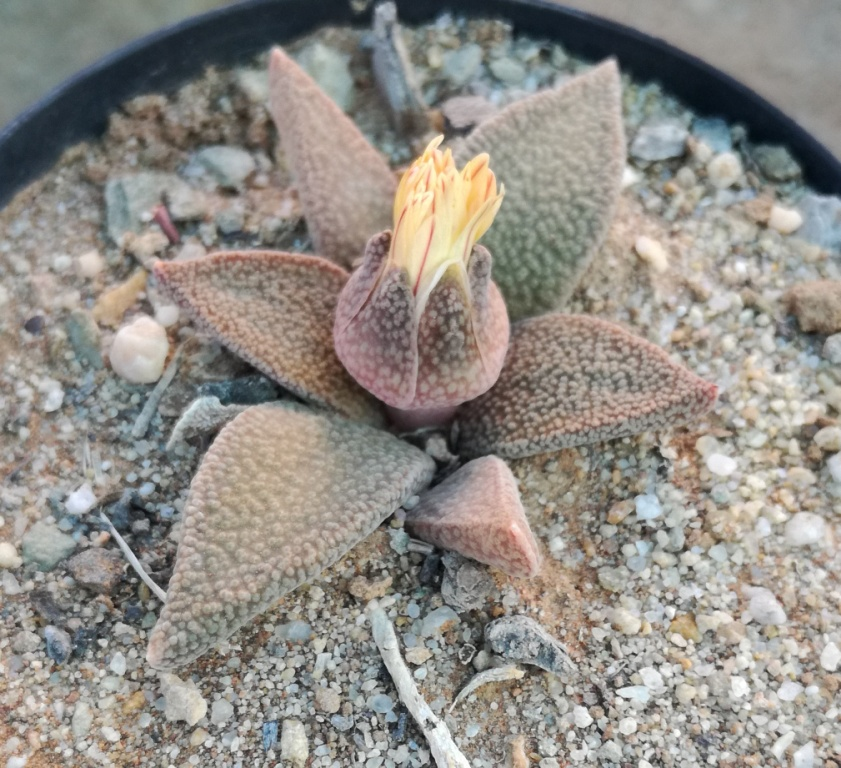

Scientific classification
- Kingdom: Plantae
- Clade: Tracheophytes
- Clade: Angiosperms
- Clade: Eudicots
- Order: Caryophyllales
- Family: Aizoaceae
- Genus: Aloinopsis
- Species: A. rubrolineata

Binomial name
- Aloinopsis rubrolineata (N.E.Br.) Schwantes

Synonyms
- Aloinopsis dyeri (L.Bolus) L.Bolus; Aloinopsis jamesii L.Bolus; Mesembryanthemum rubrolineatum N.E.Br. (1911) (basionym); Nananthus cradockensis L.Bolus; Nananthus dyeri L.Bolus; Nananthus jamesii (L.Bolus) L.Bolus; Nananthus rubrolineatus (N.E.Br.) Schwantes

= Aloinopsis rubrolineata =

Species of plant

Aloinopsis rubrolineata is a species of flowering plant in the genus Aloinopsis. It is a succulent subshrub native to the eastern Cape Provinces of South Africa. It grows in a branching habit low to the ground, and has leaves covered with small, round tubercles. The leaves are dark olive green and tongue-like in shape. Its scientific name refers to its flowers, which have a distinctive red stripe.
