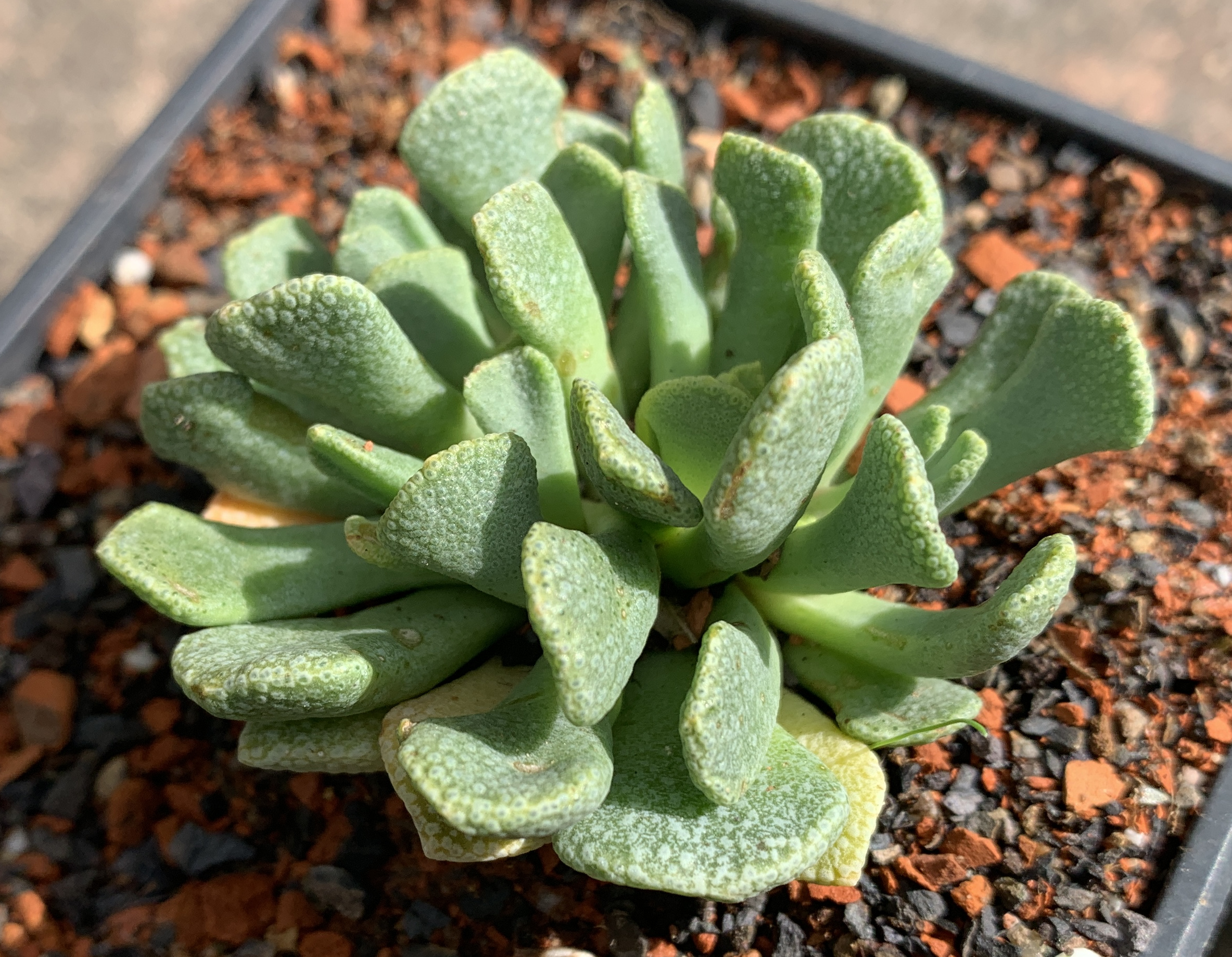

Scientific classification
- Kingdom: Plantae
- Clade: Tracheophytes
- Clade: Angiosperms
- Clade: Eudicots
- Order: Caryophyllales
- Family: Aizoaceae
- Genus: Aloinopsis
- Species: A. spathulata

Binomial name
- Aloinopsis spathulata (Thunb.) L.Bolus

Synonyms
- Aloinopsis crassipes (Marloth) L.Bolus; Mesembryanthemum crassipes Marloth; Mesembryanthemum spathulatum Thunb. (1791) (basionym); Nananthus crassipes (Marloth) L.Bolus; Nananthus spathulatus (Thunb.) G.D.Rowley; Titanopsis crassipes (Marloth) N.E.Br.; Titanopsis spathulata (Thunb.) Schwantes

= Aloinopsis spathulata =

Species of plant

Aloinopsis spathulata is a species of flowering plant in the genus Aloinopsis. it is a succulent subshrub native to the northern Cape Provinces of South Africa. It has spoon-shaped green leaves patterned with tubercles, and unlike the yellow flowers of most in its genus, it has magenta to pink blooms. Able to grow in Sutherland, the coldest town in South Africa, it is particularly frost hardy.
