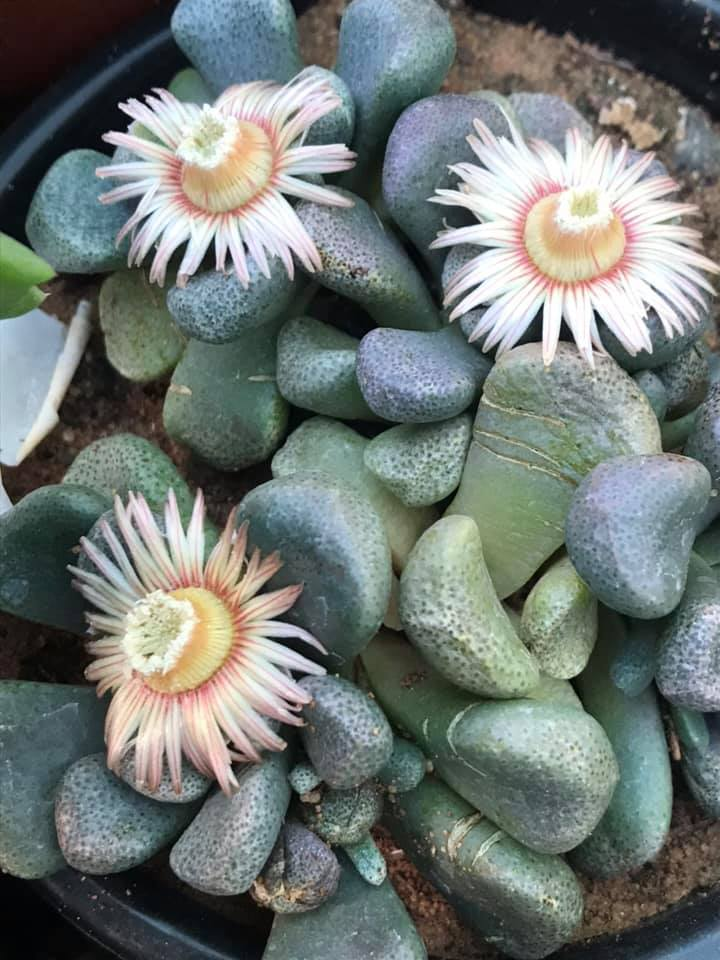
- Aloinopsis schooneesii in bloom

Scientific classification
- Kingdom: Plantae
- Clade: Embryophytes
- Clade: Tracheophytes
- Clade: Angiosperms
- Clade: Eudicots
- Order: Caryophyllales
- Family: Aizoaceae
- Genus: Aloinopsis
- Species: A. schooneesii

Binomial name
- Aloinopsis schooneesii L.Bolus

Synonyms
- Nananthus schooneesii (L.Bolus) L.Bolus

= Aloinopsis schooneesii =

Species of flowering plant

Aloinopsis schooneesii is a species of flowering plant in the genus Aloinopsis, in the ice plant family Aizoaceae, native to the eastern Cape Provinces of South Africa. It has gained the Royal Horticultural Society's Award of Garden Merit.
