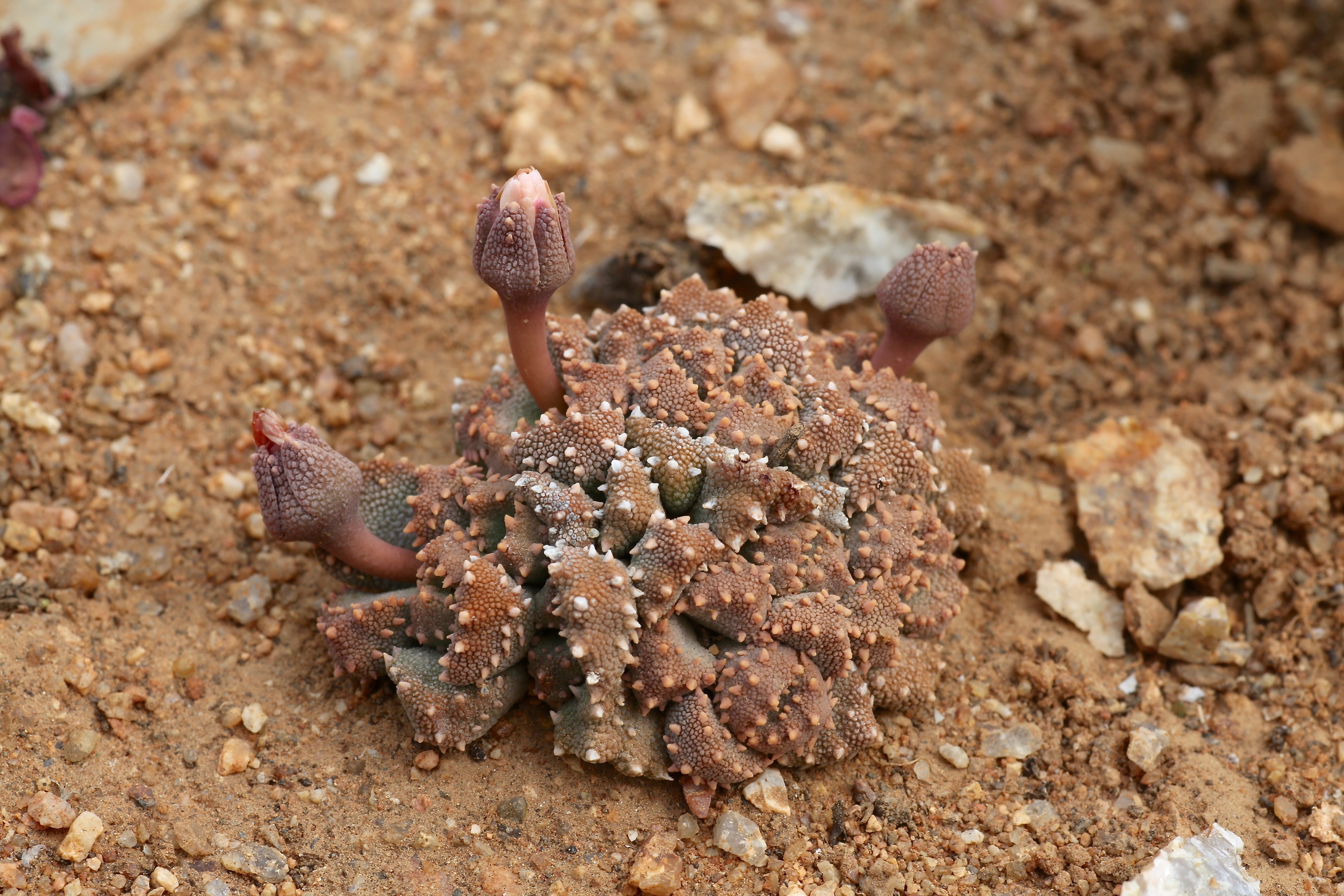
- Aloinopsis luckhoffii growing in Goegap Nature Reserve, Namaqualand

Scientific classification
- Kingdom: Plantae
- Clade: Embryophytes
- Clade: Tracheophytes
- Clade: Spermatophytes
- Clade: Angiosperms
- Clade: Eudicots
- Order: Caryophyllales
- Family: Aizoaceae
- Genus: Aloinopsis
- Species: A. luckhoffii

Binomial name
- Aloinopsis luckhoffii (L.Bolus) L.Bolus

Synonyms
- Aloinopsis lodewykii L.Bolus; Aloinopsis setifera (L.Bolus) L.Bolus; Aloinopsis villetii (L.Bolus) L.Bolus; Nananthus lodewykii (L.Bolus) L.Bolus; Nananthus luckhoffii (L.Bolus) L.Bolus; Nananthus setifer (L.Bolus) G.D.Rowley; Nananthus villetii L.Bolus; Titanopsis luckhoffii L.Bolus (1931) (basionym); Titanopsis setifera L.Bolus

= Aloinopsis luckhoffii =

Species of plant

Aloinopsis luckhoffii is a species of flowering plant in the genus Aloinopsis. It is a succulent subshrub native to the western Cape Provinces of South Africa, where it grows in deserts or dry shrublands. Like other Aloinopsis it grows in a rosette of leaves close to the ground. It has angular leaves that are covered by small, white tooth-like protrusions.
