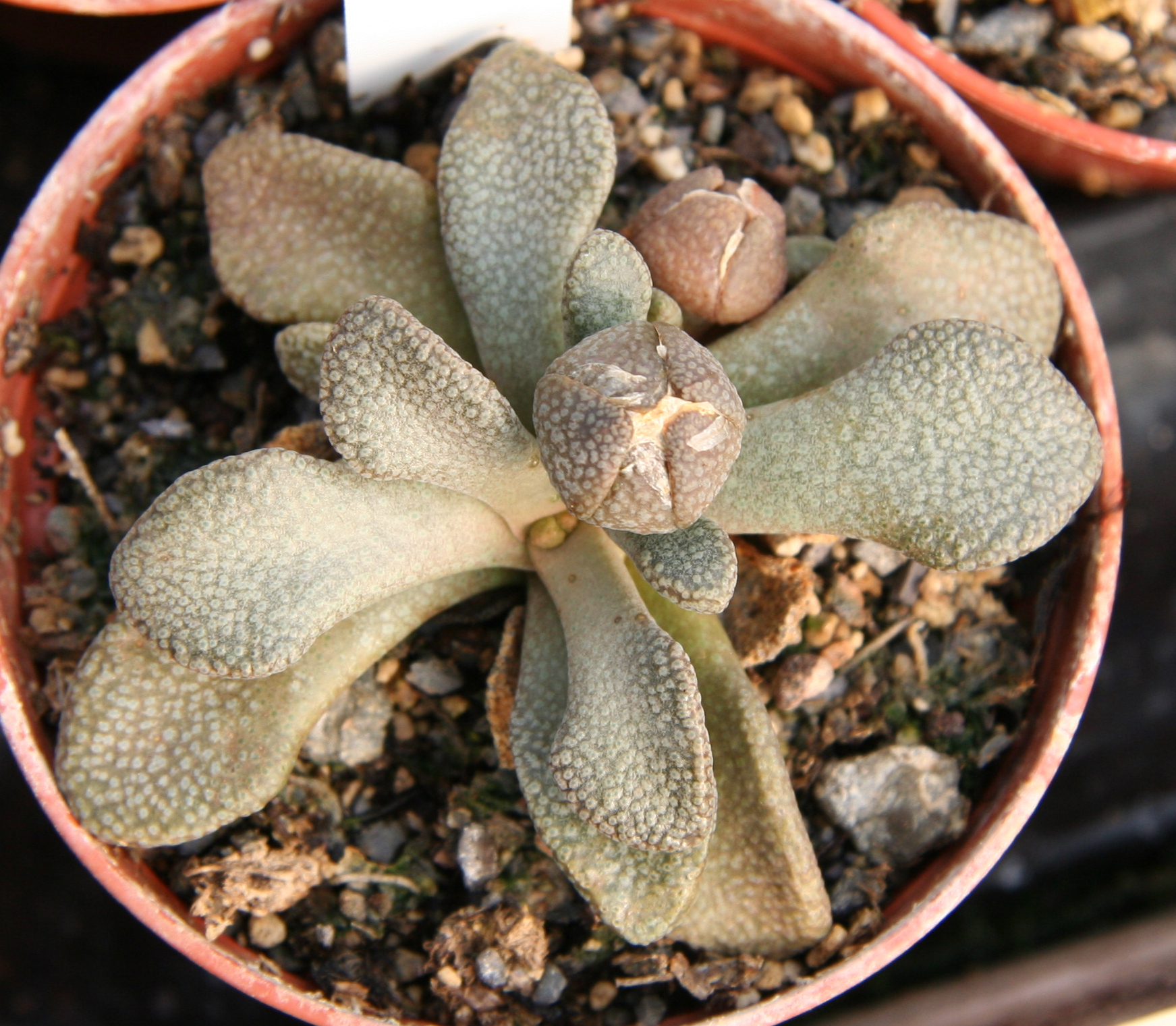

Scientific classification
- Kingdom: Plantae
- Clade: Tracheophytes
- Clade: Angiosperms
- Clade: Eudicots
- Order: Caryophyllales
- Family: Aizoaceae
- Genus: Aloinopsis
- Species: A. rosulata

Binomial name
- Aloinopsis rosulata (Kensit) Schwantes

Synonyms
- Acaulon rosulatum (Kensit) N.E.Br.; Aistocaulon rosulatum (Kensit) Poelln. ex H.Jacobsen; Mesembryanthemum rosulatum Kensit (1909) (basionym); Nananthus rosulatus (Kensit) G.D.Rowley

= Aloinopsis rosulata =

Species of succulent

Aloinopsis rosulata is a species of flowering plant in the family Aizoaceae. It is a succulent subshrub native to the eastern Cape Provinces of South Africa. It is a wintergrower, and produces a thick tuber. The flowers are pale pink with red stripes.
