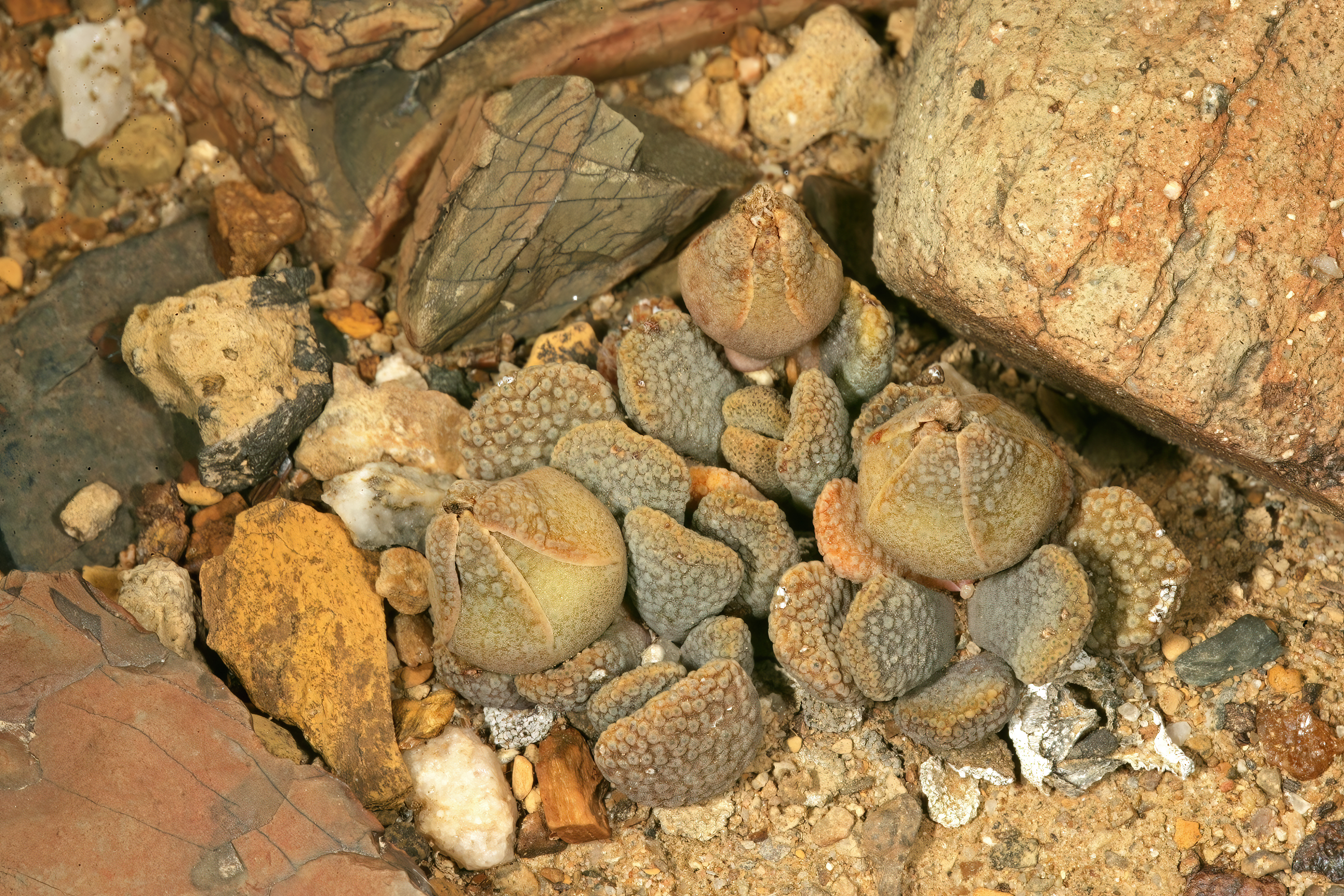

Scientific classification
- Kingdom: Plantae
- Clade: Tracheophytes
- Clade: Angiosperms
- Clade: Eudicots
- Order: Caryophyllales
- Family: Aizoaceae
- Genus: Aloinopsis
- Species: A. loganii

Binomial name
- Aloinopsis loganii L.Bolus

Synonyms
- Nananthus loganii (L.Bolus) L.Bolus

= Aloinopsis loganii =

Species of plant

Aloinopsis loganii is a small succulent plant that is part of the Aizoaceae family. The species is endemic to the Western Cape. It occurs at Matjiesfontein and has a range of less than 10 km^{2}. The plant is threatened by overgrazing.
