= Nananthus pole-evansii =

Scientific classification
- Kingdom: Plantae
- Clade: Tracheophytes
- Clade: Angiosperms
- Clade: Eudicots
- Order: Caryophyllales
- Family: Aizoaceae
- Genus: Nananthus
- Species: N. pole-evansii

Binomial name
- Nananthus pole-evansii N.E.Br.

Species of succulent

Nananthus pole-evansii is a perennial, succulent plant that is part of the Aizoaceae family. The species is endemic to South Africa and occurs in the Eastern Cape and the Free State.
