= Aloinopsis acuta =

Conservation status
- Data Deficient (IUCN 3.1)

Scientific classification
- Kingdom: Plantae
- Clade: Tracheophytes
- Clade: Angiosperms
- Clade: Eudicots
- Order: Caryophyllales
- Family: Aizoaceae
- Genus: Aloinopsis
- Species: A. acuta

Binomial name
- Aloinopsis acuta L.Bolus

Synonyms
- Nananthus acutus (L.Bolus) G.D.Rowley

Species of plant

Aloinopsis acuta is a small succulent plant that is part of the Aizoaceae family. The species is endemic to the Northern Cape. It occurs from the Roggeveld Mountains escarpment to the Nuweveld Mountains. The species is considered rare.
