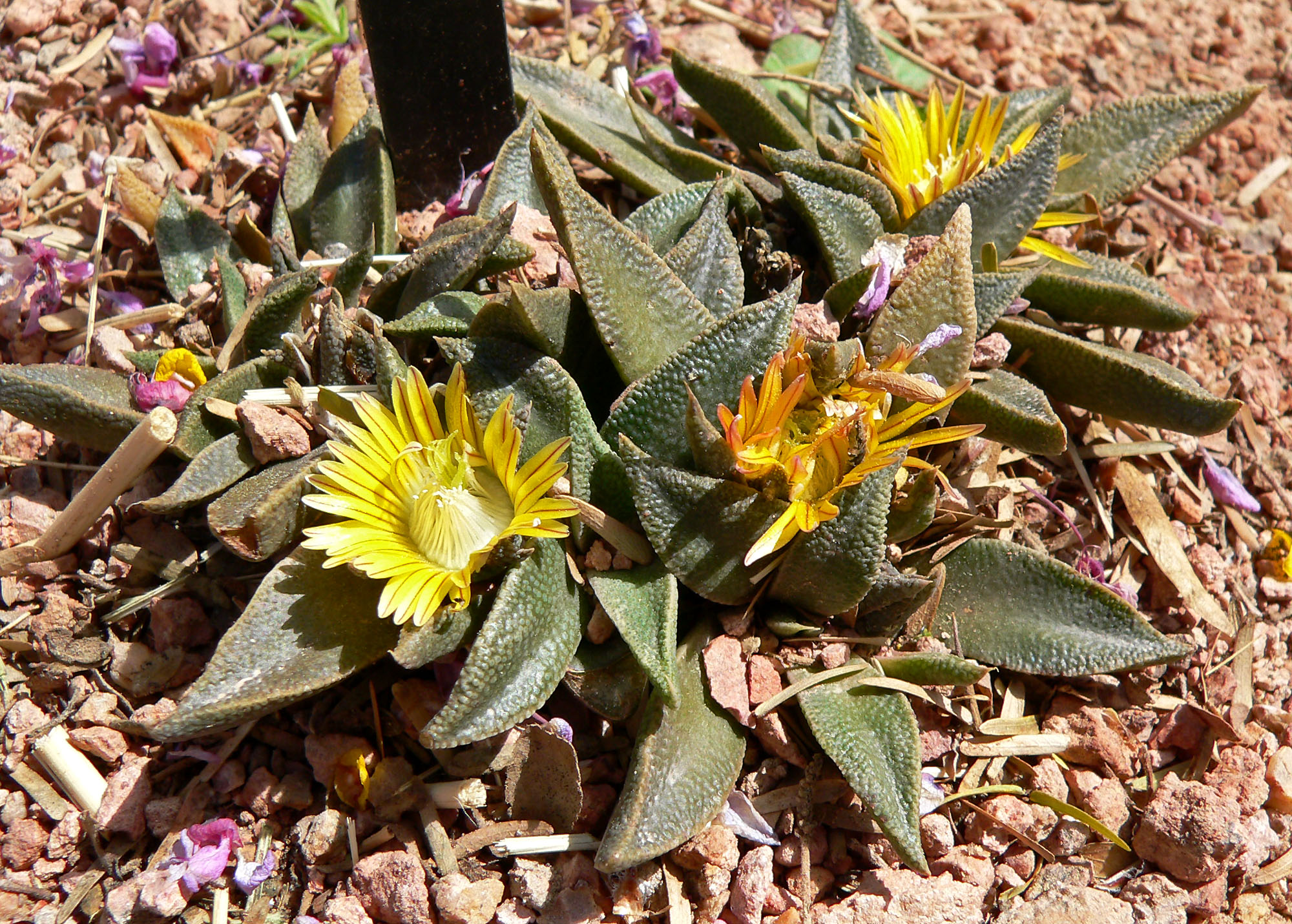

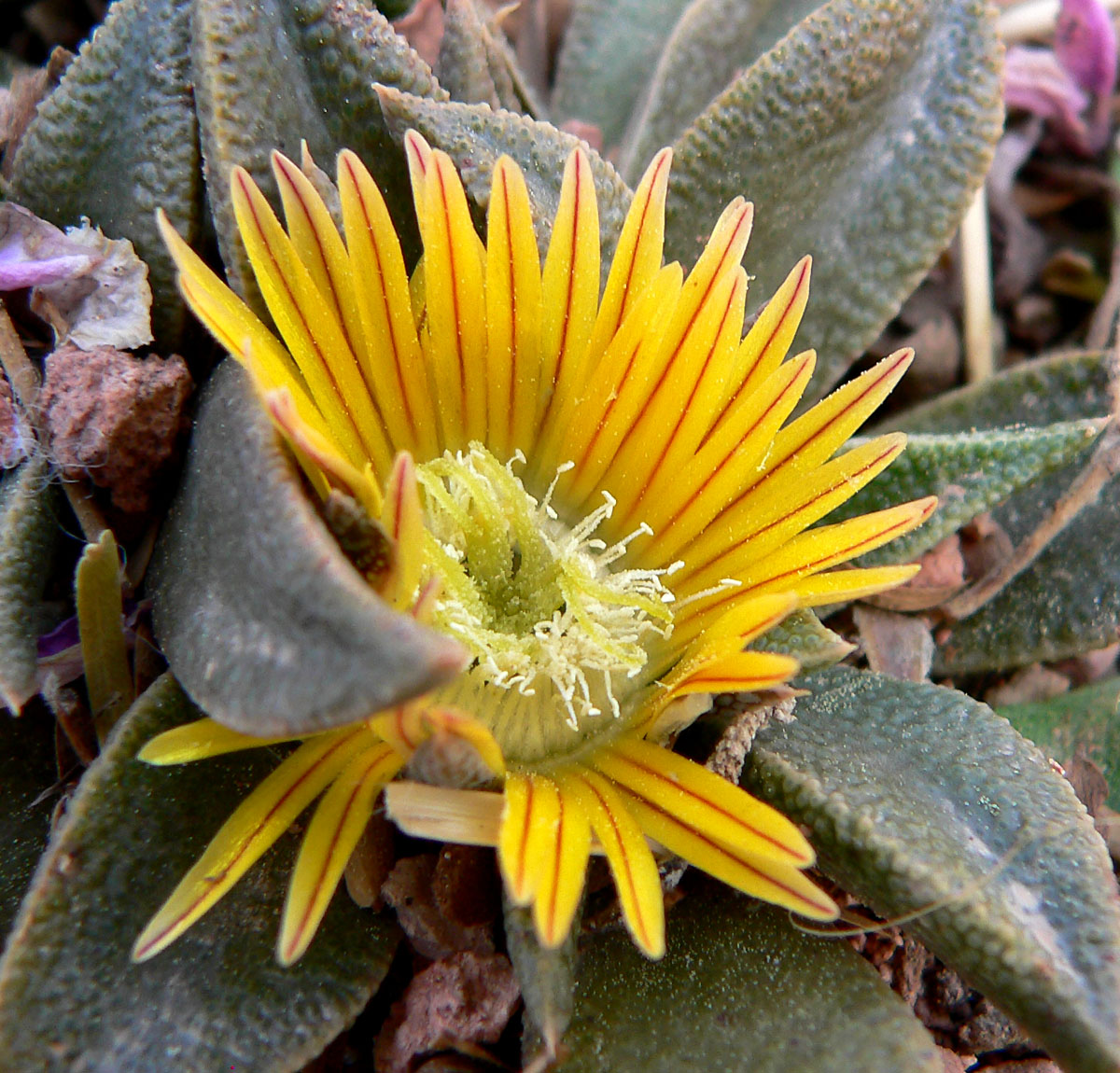

Scientific classification
- Kingdom: Plantae
- Clade: Tracheophytes
- Clade: Angiosperms
- Clade: Eudicots
- Order: Caryophyllales
- Family: Aizoaceae
- Genus: Nananthus
- Species: N. vittatus

Binomial name
- Nananthus vittatus (N.E.Br.) Schwantes

Synonyms
- Aloinopsis broomii L.Bolus; Aloinopsis cibdela (N.E.Br.) Schwantes; Aloinopsis transvaalensis (Rolfe) Schwantes; Aloinopsis vittata (N.E.Br.) Schwantes; Mesembryanthemum cibdelum N.E.Br.; Mesembryanthemum transvaalense Rolfe; Mesembryanthemum vittatum N.E.Br.; Nananthus broomii (L.Bolus) L.Bolus; Nananthus cibdelus (N.E.Br.) Schwantes; Nananthus transvaalensis (Rolfe) L.Bolus; Rabiea cibdela (N.E.Br.) N.E.Br.

= Nananthus vittatus =

Species of flowering plant

Nananthus vittatus, also known as the banded nananthus in English and the brakveldvygie and stryvygie in Afrikaans, is a perennial, succulent plant that is part of the Aizoaceae family. The species is endemic to the Northern Cape, North West and the Free State.
