= Prepodesma =

Scientific classification
- Kingdom: Plantae
- Clade: Tracheophytes
- Clade: Angiosperms
- Clade: Eudicots
- Order: Caryophyllales
- Family: Aizoaceae
- Genus: Prepodesma; N.E.Br.
- Species: P. orpenii

Binomial name
- Prepodesma orpenii (N.E.Br.) N.E.Br.

Synonyms
- Aloinopsis orpenii (N.E.Br.) L.Bolus (1929); Mesembryanthemum orpenii N.E.Br. (1921); Nananthus orpenii (N.E.Br.) L.Bolus (1938); Nananthus tersa (N.E.Br.) G.D.Rowley (1978); Rabiea tersa N.E.Br. (1931)

Genus of plants

Prepodesma is a monotypic genus of flowering plants belonging to the family Aizoaceae. The only species is Prepodesma orpenii.

It is endemic to the northern Cape Provinces of South Africa.
