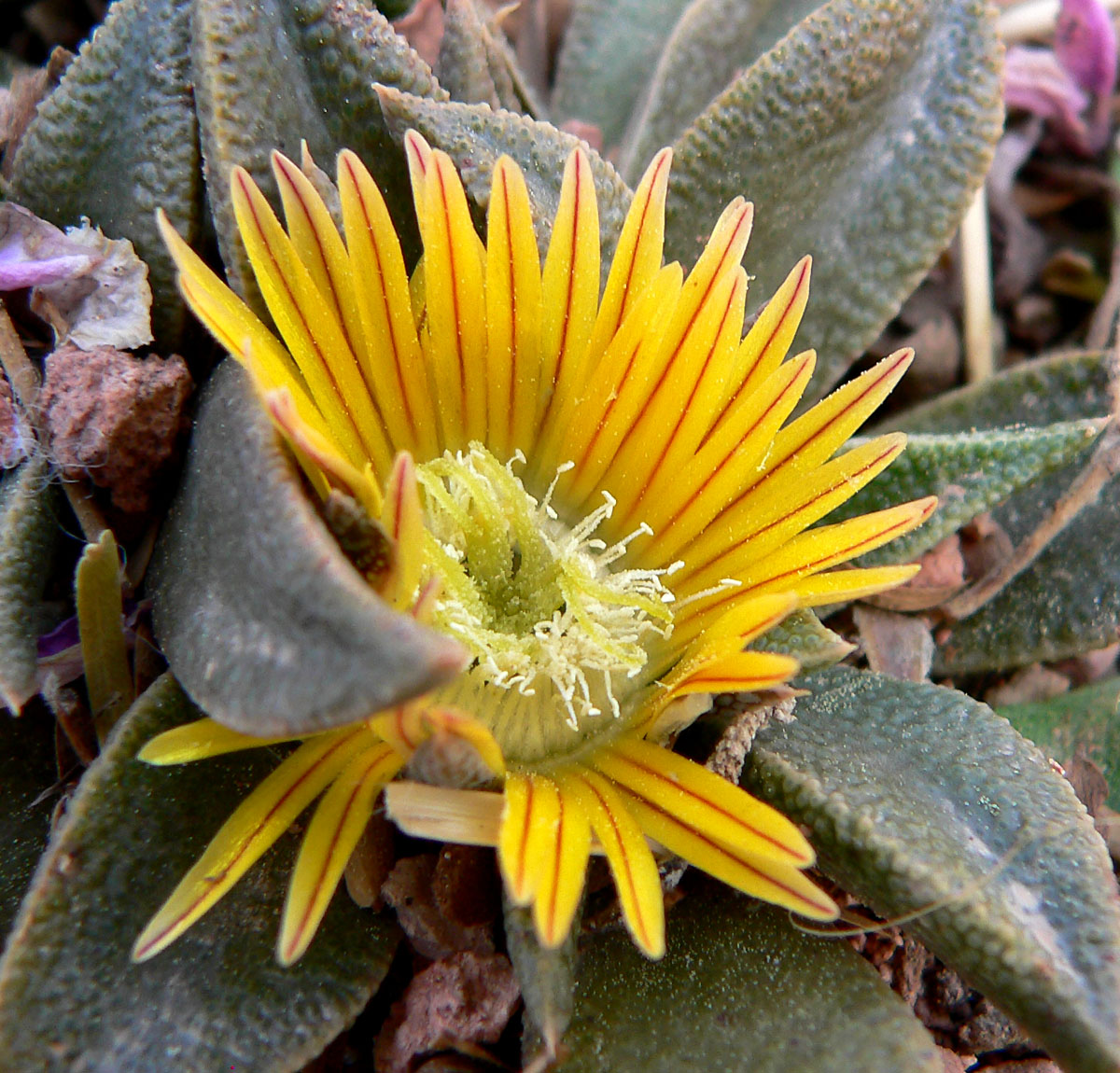
- Nananthus vittatus

Scientific classification
- Kingdom: Plantae
- Clade: Tracheophytes
- Clade: Angiosperms
- Clade: Eudicots
- Order: Caryophyllales
- Family: Aizoaceae
- Subfamily: Ruschioideae
- Tribe: Ruschieae
- Genus: Nananthus; N.E.Br.

= Nananthus =

Genus of plants

Nananthus is a genus of flowering plants belonging to the family Aizoaceae.

Its native range is Southern Africa.

== Species ==
Species:

- Nananthus aloides (Haw.) Schwantes
- Nananthus gerstneri (L.Bolus) L.Bolus
- Nananthus margaritifer L.Bolus
- Nananthus pallens (L.Bolus) L.Bolus
- Nananthus pole-evansii N.E.Br.
- Nananthus vittatus (N.E.Br.) Schwantes
