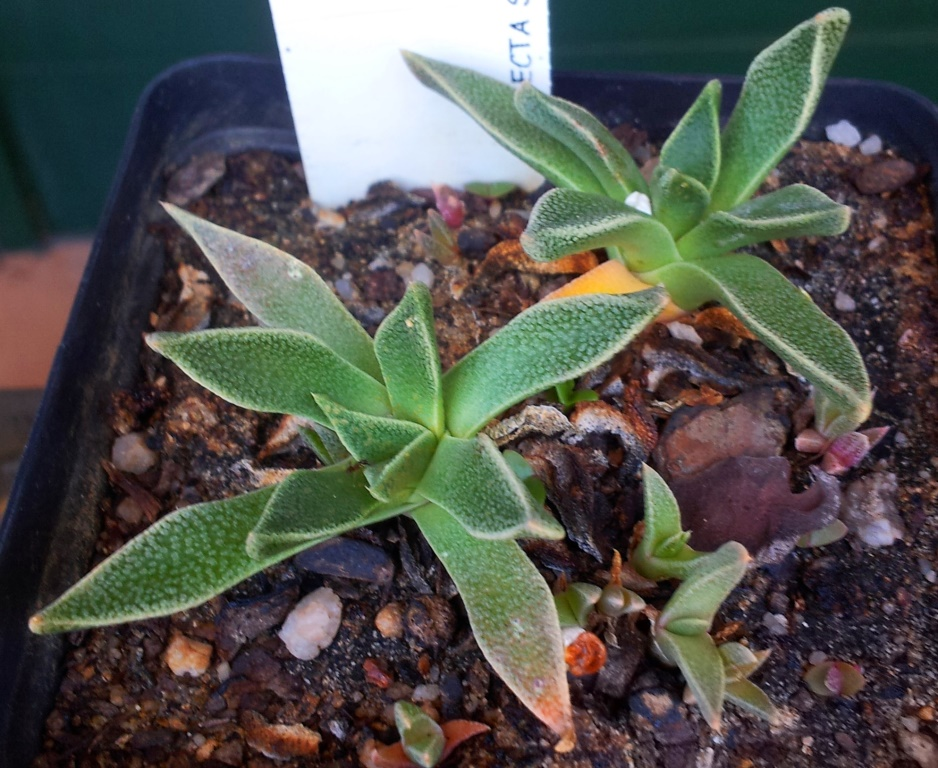

Scientific classification
- Kingdom: Plantae
- Clade: Tracheophytes
- Clade: Angiosperms
- Clade: Eudicots
- Order: Caryophyllales
- Family: Aizoaceae
- Genus: Nananthus
- Species: N. aloides

Binomial name
- Nananthus aloides (Haw.) Schwantes

Synonyms
- Aloinopsis aloides (Haw.) Schwantes; Aloinopsis wilmaniae L.Bolus; Mesembryanthemum aloides Haw.; Nananthus wilmaniae (L.Bolus) L.Bolus

= Nananthus aloides =

Species of succulent

Nananthus aloides, commonly known as the vlaktevygie in Afrikaans, is a perennial, succulent plant that is part of the Aizoaceae family. The species is native to Botswana and South Africa. In South Africa, the plant occurs in the North West and the Northern Cape.
