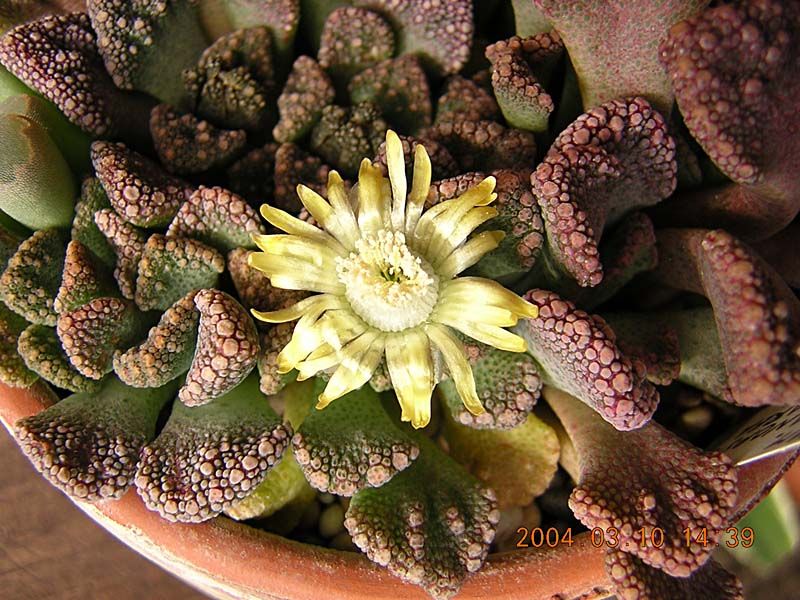
- Titanopsis calcarea in cultivation

Scientific classification
- Kingdom: Plantae
- Clade: Tracheophytes
- Clade: Angiosperms
- Clade: Eudicots
- Order: Caryophyllales
- Family: Aizoaceae
- Subfamily: Ruschioideae
- Tribe: Ruschieae
- Genus: Titanopsis; Schwantes

Species
- See text

Synonyms
- Verrucifera N.E.Br.

= Titanopsis =

Genus of succulents

Titanopsis is a genus of about four species of succulent plants of the family Aizoaceae, indigenous to the arid regions of South Africa and Namibia.

The name Titanopsis is derived from the Greek word titanos, chalk, and opsis, meaning appearance.

== Distribution ==
The genus has a disjunct distribution, occurring in three separate areas of southern Africa: southern Namibia, the region around the south-eastern border of Namibia and a larger area spanning between the former Cape Province and Orange Free State in South Africa. This unusual distribution means that the different Titanopsis species live in different rainfall systems—either summer or winter rainfall depending on the species.

== Description ==
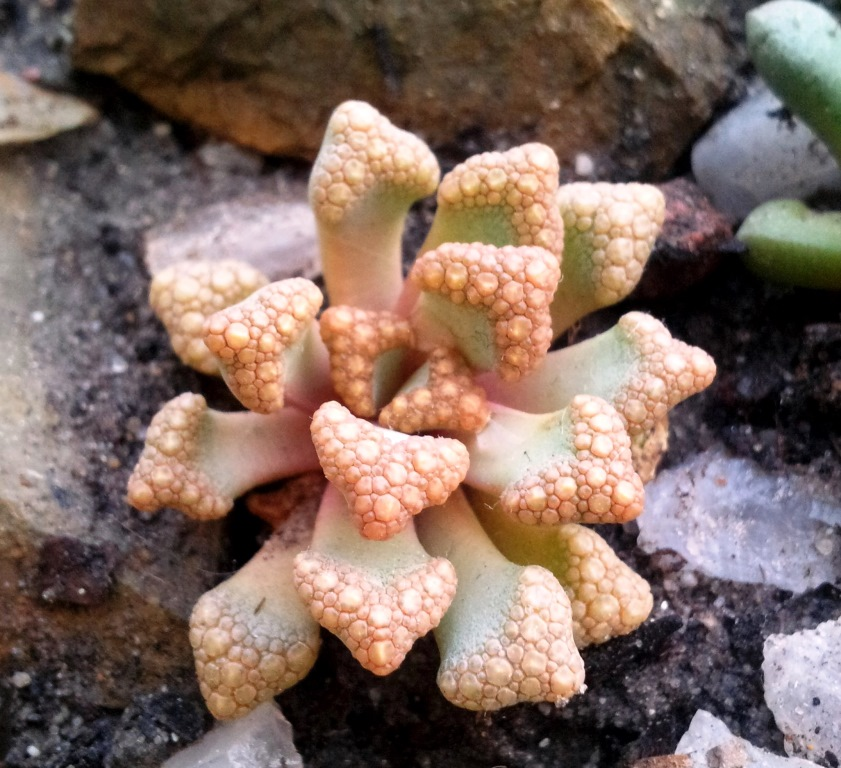
Titanopsis hugo-schlechteri, showing the genus's distinctively warty leaf tubercles.

Titanopsis succulents are small plants, often found growing low to the ground with a thick root system that branches out six to ten times.

The plant itself is often hidden by its own leaves, which grows in clusters of four to eight, forming a rosette pattern. These leaves have a truncate tip and rough warty little tubercles at the apex of the leaves. When fully grown, the leaves range from 20–25 mm (0.79–0.98 in) long.

The tips of the leaves have been noted to resemble limestone, allowing the plant to blend into its surroundings in its natural rocky habitat.

In the fall, the plant produces one to three yellow flowers with a 2 cm (0.79 in) diameter. These flowers lack any extra bracts.

== Species ==
Plants of the World Online accepts the following species:

Image	Scientific name	Distribution
	Titanopsis calcarea (Marloth) Schwantes	South Africa
	Titanopsis hugo-schlechteri (Tischer) Dinter & Schwantes	Namibia & South Africa
	Titanopsis primosii L.Bolus ex S.A.Hammer	South Africa
	Titanopsis schwantesii (Dinter ex Schwantes) Schwantes	Namibia & South Africa

== Cultivation ==
Cultivation can happen with full sun, well-drained soil, and attention to the natural rainfall of the particular species' habitat.

The more popular species from the eastern areas, such as Titanopsis calcarea, fulleri and luederitzii are adapted to summer rainfall, while those from further west, rarer species such as Titanopsis schwantesii and hugo-schlecteri, are adapted to winter rainfall, when they also flower.

The plants are calcicole (they appreciate calcareous soils), but any typical loose succulent soil mix is suitable. Division of larger clumps is possible in some cases, but as most species have tuberous rootstocks and offset slowly, seed production is the most common method of propagation.
