= Deilanthe =

Scientific classification
- Kingdom: Plantae
- Clade: Tracheophytes
- Clade: Angiosperms
- Clade: Eudicots
- Order: Caryophyllales
- Family: Aizoaceae
- Genus: Deilanthe; N.E.Br.

Genus of plants

Deilanthe is a genus of flowering plants belonging to the family Aizoaceae. It is native to the Cape Provinces and Free State in South Africa.

== Species ==
Three species are accepted.

- Deilanthe hilmarii (L.Bolus) H.E.K.Hartmann
- Deilanthe peersii (L.Bolus) N.E.Br.
- Deilanthe thudichumii (L.Bolus) S.A.Hammer
