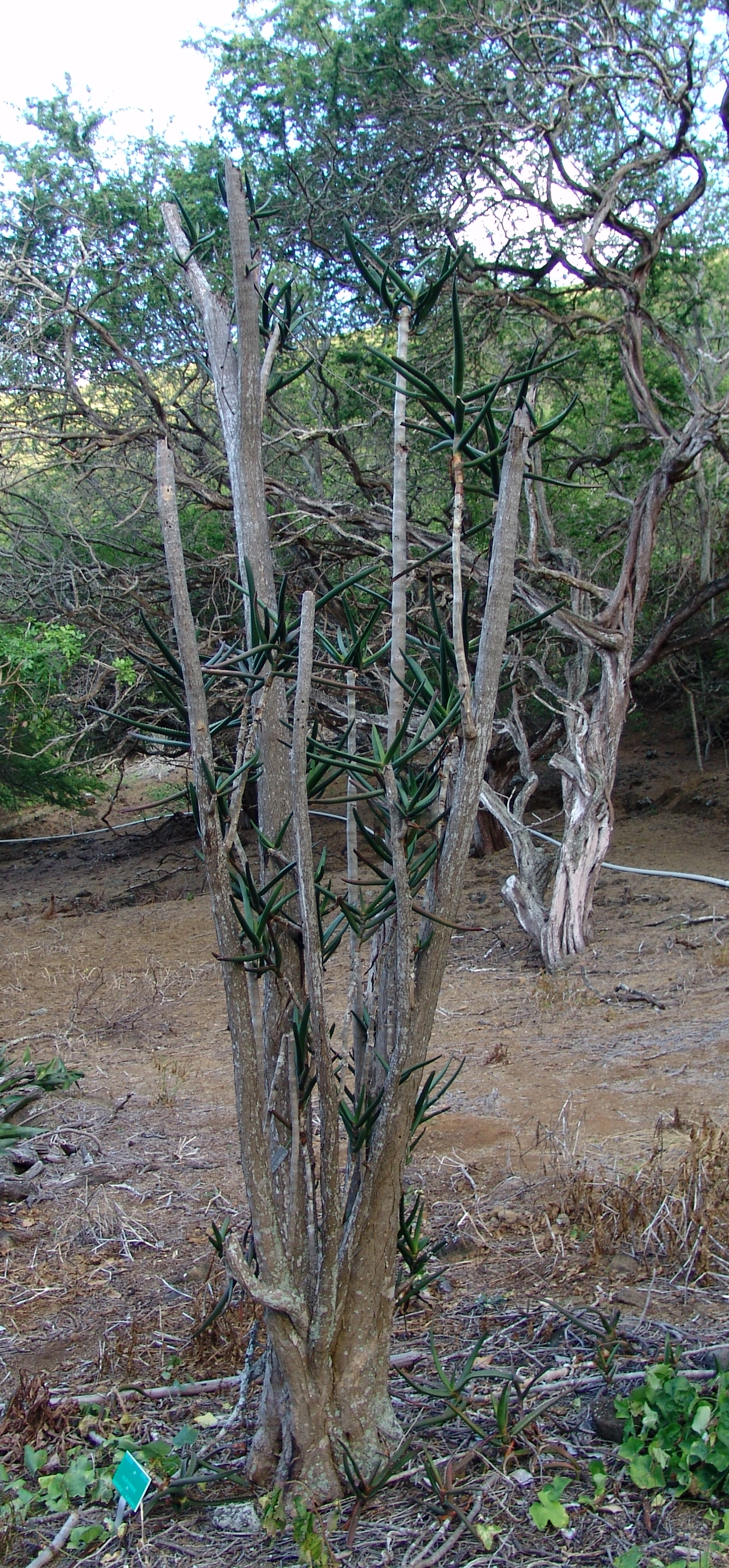

Conservation status
- Endangered (IUCN 3.1)

Scientific classification
- Kingdom: Plantae
- Clade: Tracheophytes
- Clade: Angiosperms
- Clade: Monocots
- Order: Asparagales
- Family: Asphodelaceae
- Subfamily: Asphodeloideae
- Tribe: Aloeae
- Genus: Aloidendron
- Species: A. eminens

Binomial name
- Aloidendron eminens (Reynolds & P.R.O.Bally) Klopper & Gideon F.Sm.

Synonyms
- Aloe eminens Reynolds & P.R.O.Bally

= Aloidendron eminens =

Species of flowering plant

Aloidendron eminens, formerly Aloe eminens, is a species of succulent plant in the genus Aloidendron, endemic to Somalia.

== Description and taxonomy ==
It grows as a massive, branching tree of roughly 35 feet in height. It looks similar to its close relative, the giant tree aloe (Aloidendron barberae) of South Africa, however its leaves are slightly more yellow, and it produces bright red flowers.

== Distribution and habitat ==
It is endemic to Somalia, where it is indigenous to the northern area around Erigavo. Here its habitat is rocky limestone slopes and forested ravines, where it often occurs on forest verges. It is threatened by habitat loss.
