= Richtersveld =

Desert in South Africa

Richtersveld Cultural and Botanical Landscape
UNESCO World Heritage Site
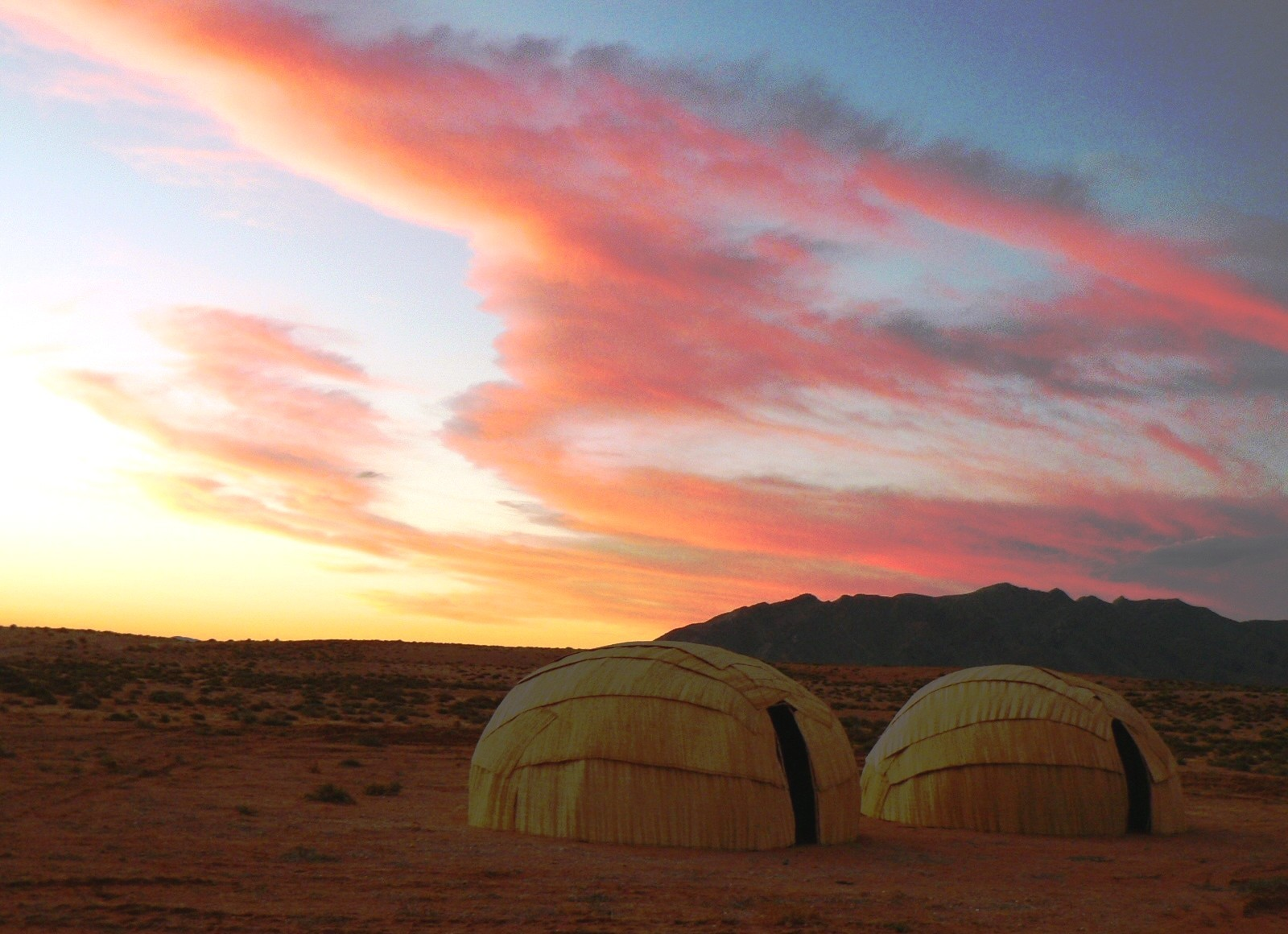
- Mat houses at Glybank near Kuboes

- Location within Northern Cape Location within South Africa
- Location: Northern Cape, South Africa
- Criteria: Cultural: (iv), (v)
- Reference: 1265
- Inscription: 2007 (31st Session)
- Area: 160,000 ha (400,000 acres)
- Buffer zone: 398,425 ha (984,530 acres)
- Coordinates: 28°36′0″S 17°12′14″E

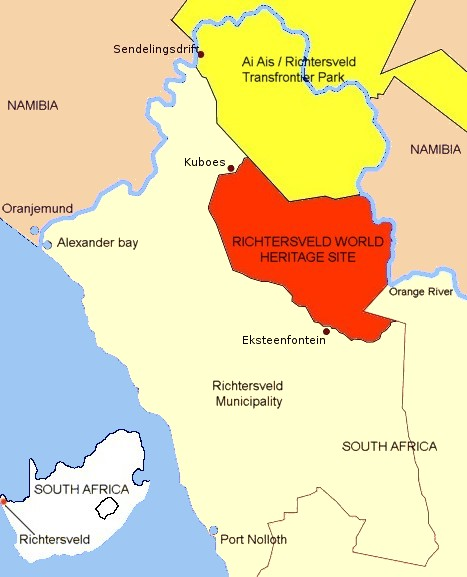
Map showing the location and extent of the Richtersveld World Heritage Site and the Richtersveld National Park.

The Richtersveld is a desert landscape characterised by rugged kloofs and high mountains, situated in the north-western corner of South Africa’s Northern Cape province. It is full of changing scenery from flat, sandy, coastal plains, to craggy sharp mountains of volcanic rock and the lushness of the Orange River, which forms the border with neighboring Namibia. The area ranges in altitude from sea level, to 1,377 m (4,518 ft) at Cornellberg. Located in the north-western side of the Northern Cape province in South Africa, the Richtersveld is regarded as the only arid biodiversity hotspot on earth and the majority of the area is inscribed on UNESCO's World Heritage List due to its cultural values.

The Nama people of Richtersveld claimed title to their traditional land and set aside this conservancy for future research and tourism. The northern part of the area was proclaimed in 1991 after 18 years of negotiations between the National Parks Board and the local Nama people who continue to live and graze their livestock in the area. It has an area of 1,624.45 square kilometres (627.20 sq mi). This is a space for Nama people who live what is known as a transhumant lifestyle – where they migrate seasonally with their livestock and make use of a fragile succulent ecosystem. The community conservancy is bordered to the north by the Richtersveld National Park (managed by the Richtersveld community and the South African National Parks) the Nababiep Provincial Nature Reserve and designated community grazing areas that allow the Nama people to continue with their lifestyle.

== Richtersveld National Park ==
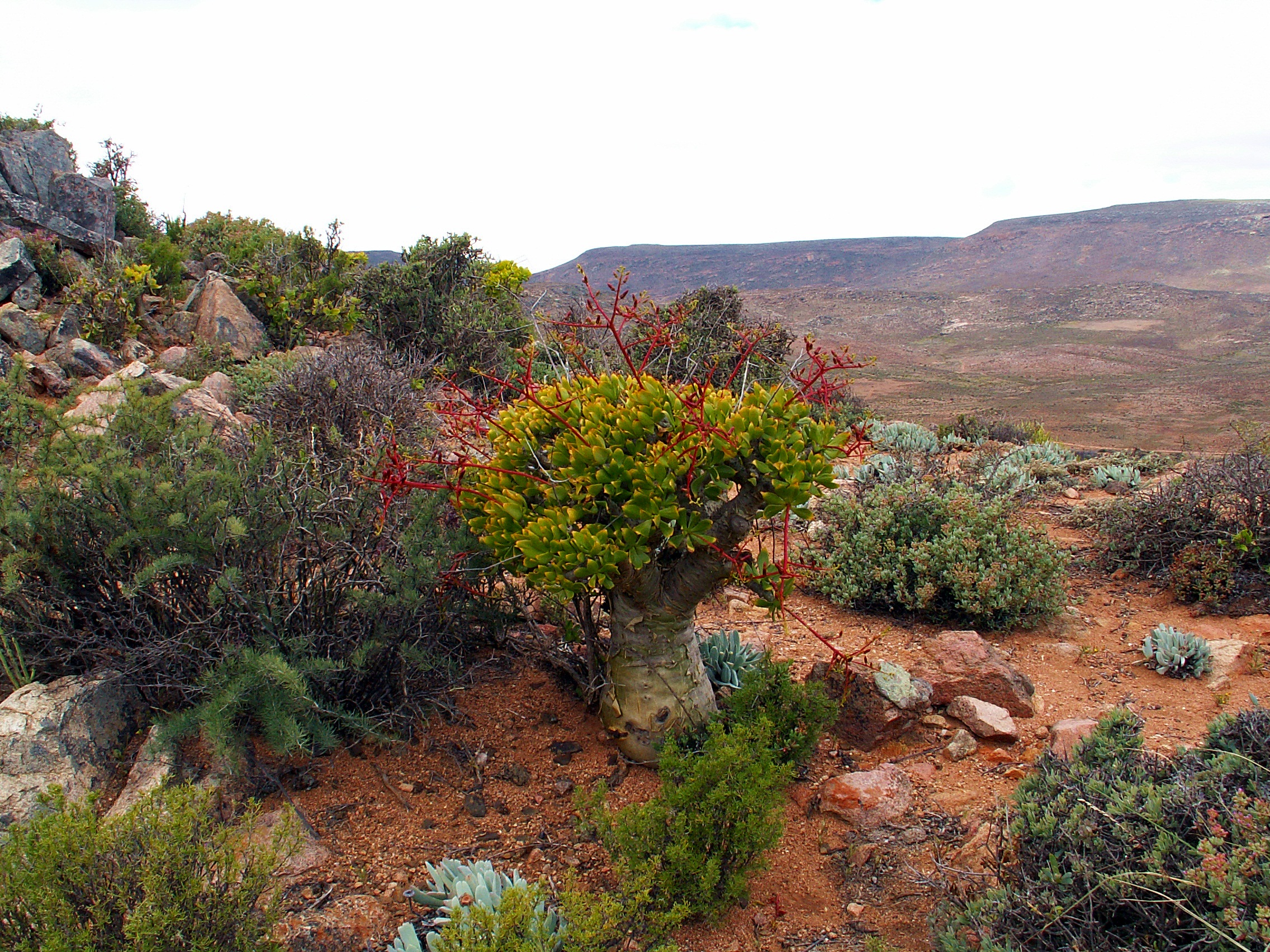
Richtersveld National Park

Richtersveld National Park is the South-African part of the ǀAi-ǀAis/Richtersveld Transfrontier Park.

== World Heritage Site ==
In June 2007, the "Richtersveld Cultural and Botanical Landscape", just to the south of the National Park and an area of equivalent size and beauty, was named a UNESCO World Heritage Site. Unlike the National Park, the Richtersveld Community Conservancy, which forms the core zone of the World Heritage Site, is not subject to diamond mining and is as a result the more pristine of the two areas.

== Climate ==
The Richtersveld is characterized by harsh summer temperatures which have been recorded to reach approximately 53 °C (127 °F) in mid-summer. Nights are cool and bring with them heavy dew. With water being scarce, life in the Richtersveld depends on moisture from the early morning fog. Locals call it 'Ihuries' or 'Malmokkies' and it makes survival possible for a range of small reptiles, birds and mammals. Temperatures drop between April and May to more temperate levels, however, through June - August the nights grow much colder. Strong gale-force winds often pick up in the winter and these cause sandstorms. The wind is often cold due to the influence from the Atlantic Ocean in the west.

The Richtersfeld is a transitional zone between the coastal Succulent Karoo ecoregion in the west, and the drier Nama Karoo to the east. Rainfall in the Richtersveld varies from 5 mm per annum in the east to 200 mm per annum in the west. The western mountainous region receives mainly winter rainfall as well as life-giving mists from the ocean. The eastern area along the Orange River is drier and the rain more often arrives in summer, often as large thunderstorms. By late August through to early October spring arrives with a vast floral blooming of daisy species (Osteospermum) and "vygies" (Lampranthus), namely in Namaqualand.

== Wildlife ==
The Richtersveld offers habitats for a diverse range of mammal, reptile, and bird species. These include the Grey rhebok, Duiker, Steenbok, Klipspringer, Hartmann's mountain zebra, Chacma baboon, Vervet monkey, Caracal and the African leopard. Reptiles include snakes such as the Puff adder, Black Spitting Cobra, and the Nama Tiger Snake, and lizards which mainly comprise species of Agama. Species of weaver birds, doves, and Guineafowl are often found inland, although bird species become more diverse during the rainier winter season. The threatened Richtersveld katydid (Africariola longicauda) is endemic to the area. In addition there are several species of spiders and scorpions.

== Plant life ==
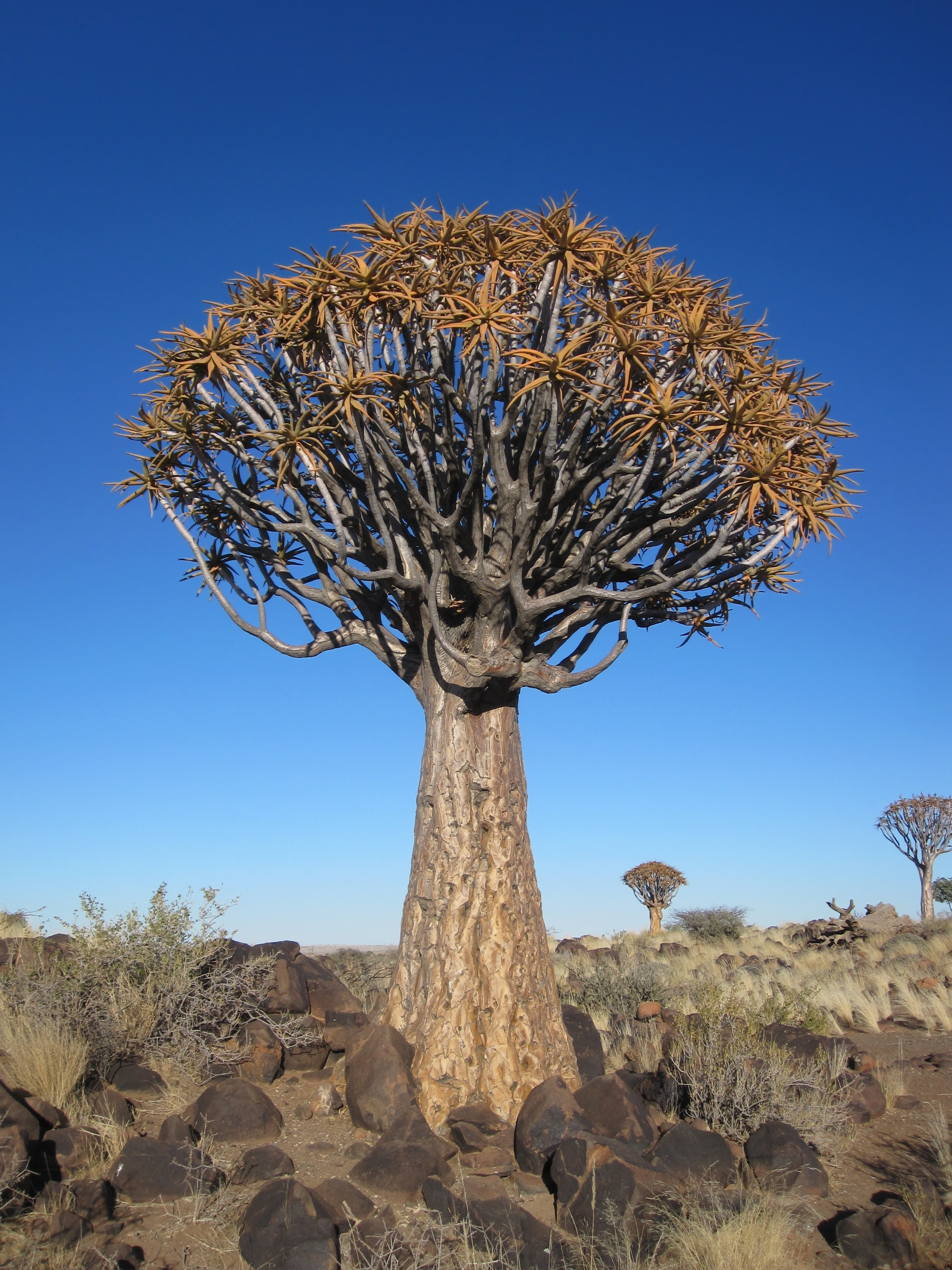
Quiver tree or kokerboom, Aloidendron dichotomum, a tall tree aloe

Approximately 4,849 plant species, 40 percent of which are endemic, have been documented in the Richtersveld and comprise mainly succulent and aloe species.

The area is home to a number of rather unusual plants, many of which are found nowhere else on earth. Chief among these is the "Halfmensboom"(Pachypodium namaquanum Welw.) meaning "half-person tree" , the name comes from the plant's resemblance to the human form. These trees are revered by the indigenous Nama people as the embodiment of their ancestors, half human, half plant, mourning for their ancient Namibian home. Also found here are three endemic species of the tree aloe Aloidendron: A. dichotomum, A. pillansii and A. ramosissimum, often referred to as "kokerbooms" or "quiver trees".

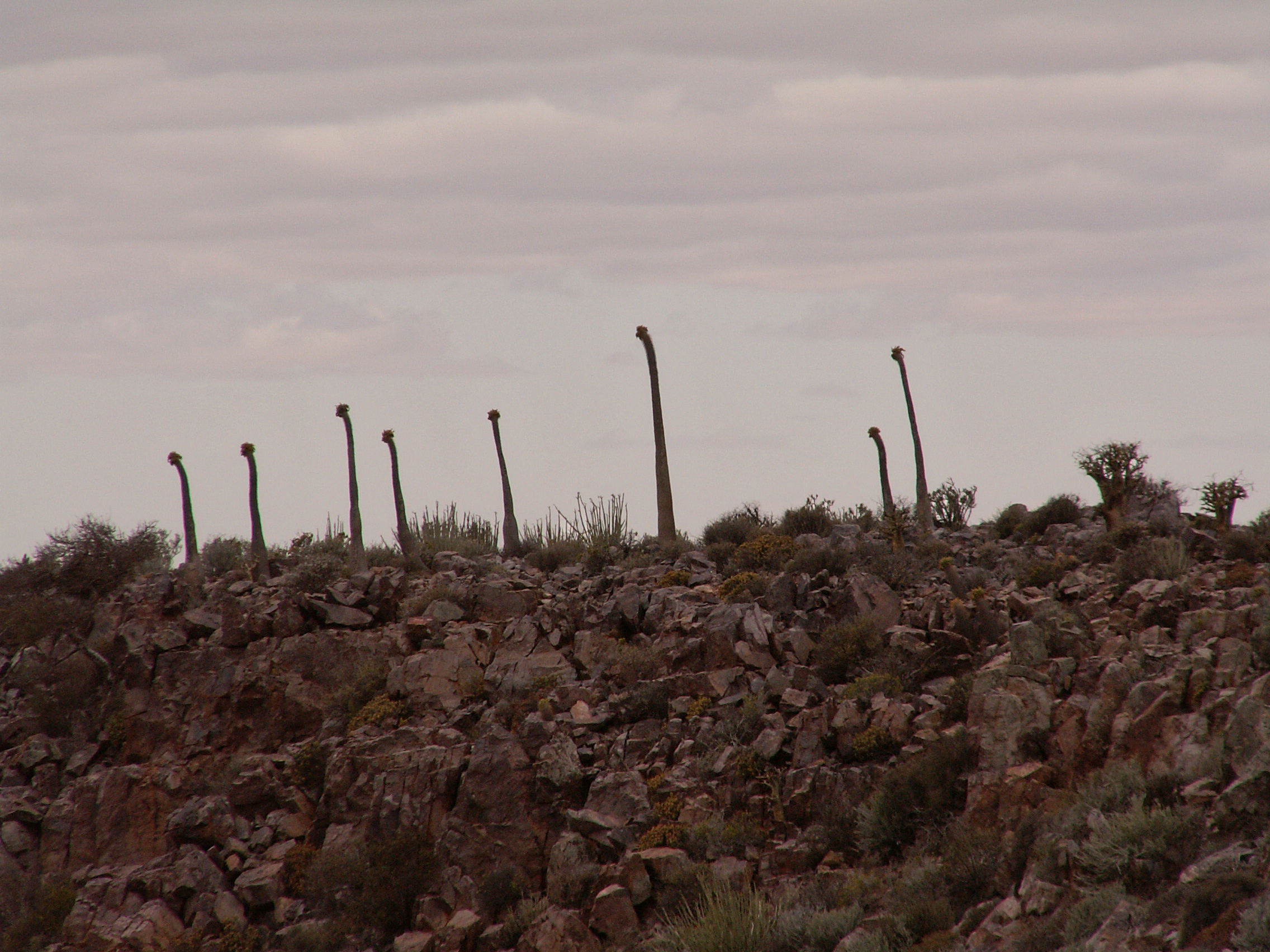
Halfmensboom

== Culture ==
The area is inhabited by Nama and other peoples. The local community, which owns the entire area, manages the National Park in conjunction with South African National Parks and is entirely responsible for management of the World Heritage Site. Both areas are used by traditional nomadic/transhumance herders to practice their ancient lifestyle and culture. It is the last place where the traditional way of life of the Khoikhoi (of whom the Nama are the largest surviving clan) who once occupied the entire south-western part of Africa, survives to any great extent. The World Heritage Site is declared under the cultural criteria of the World Heritage Convention although it is recognised that the cultural values of the community and their continued existence are intrinsically connected to the environment.

== See also ==
- South African National Parks
