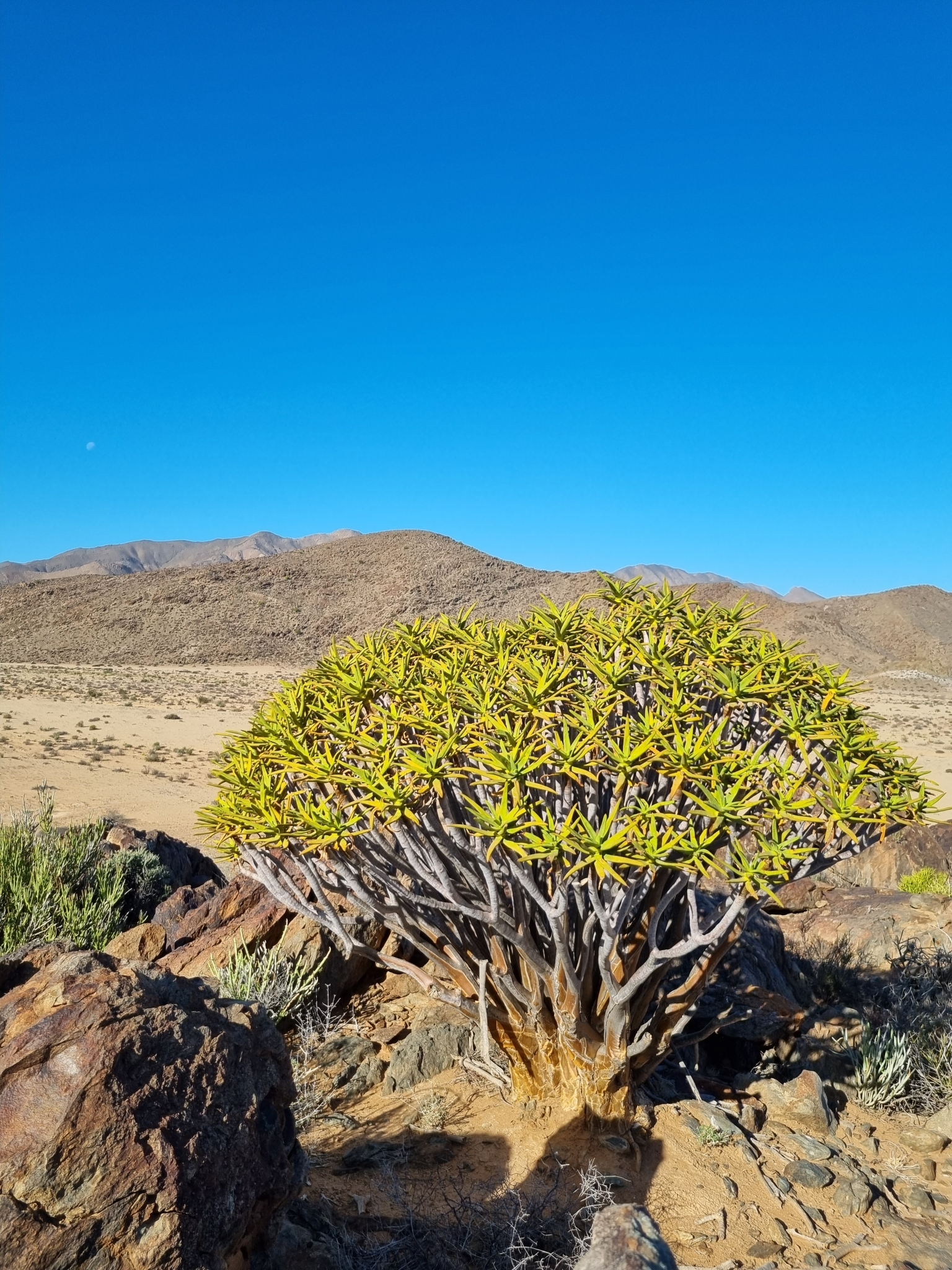

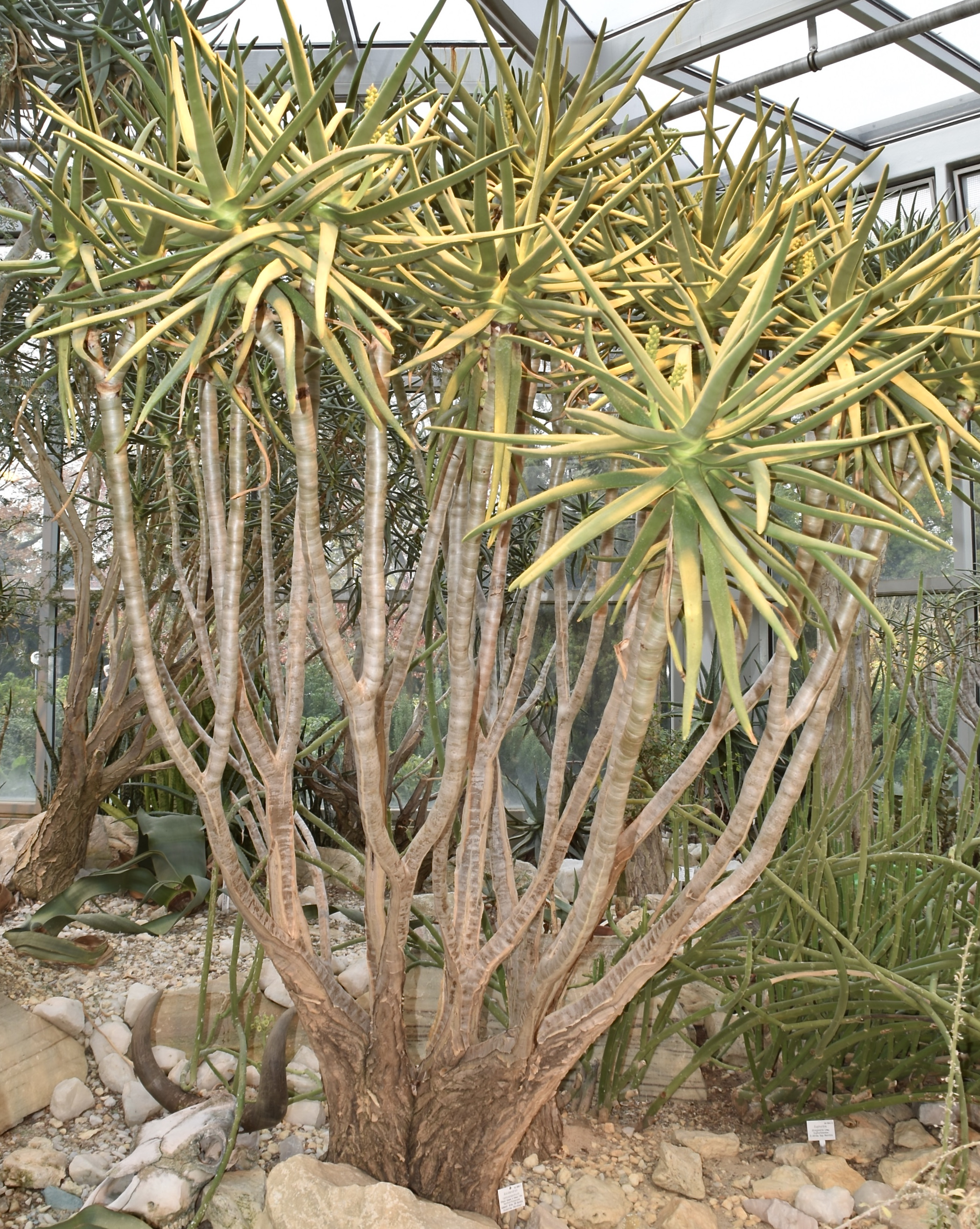
- Specimen at Palmengarten, Frankfurt, Germany.

Conservation status
- Endangered (IUCN 3.1)

Scientific classification
- Kingdom: Plantae
- Clade: Tracheophytes
- Clade: Angiosperms
- Clade: Monocots
- Order: Asparagales
- Family: Asphodelaceae
- Subfamily: Asphodeloideae
- Tribe: Aloeae
- Genus: Aloidendron
- Species: A. ramosissimum

Binomial name
- Aloidendron ramosissimum (Pillans) Klopper & Gideon F.Sm.
- Aloidendron ramosissimum range Extant (resident)

Synonyms
- Aloe ramosissima Pillans; Aloe dichotoma var. ramosissima (Pillans) Glen & D.S.Hardy; Aloe dichotoma subsp. ramosissima (Pillans) Zonn.

= Aloidendron ramosissimum =

Species of flowering plant

Aloidendron ramosissimum (formerly Aloe ramosissima), or the maiden's quiver tree, is a species of endangered succulent flowering plant in the family Asphodelaceae (order Asparagales) found in southern Africa.

== Distribution ==
A. ramosissimum is endemic to the Richtersveld, at the border between northwestern South Africa and southern Namibia, where it grows on desert slopes and in ravines, as well as some open, flat areas. In Namibia, it is known from the southern inland Ilkaras (Karas) Region, north of the border with South Africa. Its range continues into the Northern Cape province, having been observed as far south as Springbok.

== Description ==
A. ramosissimum is similar in appearance to A. dichotomum, or even the larger A. barberae, but grows bushier and shorter in stature. The plant rarely exceeds 60 centimeters (approx. 2 ft) in height; select, undisturbed specimens may reach 1.22-1.5 m (between 4–5 ft). A. ramosissimum's validity as a distinct species has also been debated; it has been treated as both a variety and a subspecies of A. dichotomum.

== Conservation ==
Despite the aridity of its native habitat, the areas of Southern Africa where this species grows may eventually be threatened by mining and its associated pollutive practices, as well as the increased presence of livestock contributing to overgrazing. Given the area's lack of water for a large part of the year, many species of herbivorous ungulates—both domesticated and wild—readily consume the endemic succulent plants found there for their moisture content, ranging from immature sprouts to larger, more substantial specimens; for this reason, many of Southern Africa's plant species have evolved strange or bizarre appearances (e.g. Lithops, Pleiospilos, etc.) or woody trunks (such as the Aloidendron) to more effectively camouflage and protect themselves from grazing herbivores. Nonetheless, immature specimens or very small Aloidendron plantlets that are consumed and/or trampled by grazing animals will never reach maturity, and thus will not be able to reproduce and further the species' distribution. The IUCN considers the species endangered.

== Gallery ==
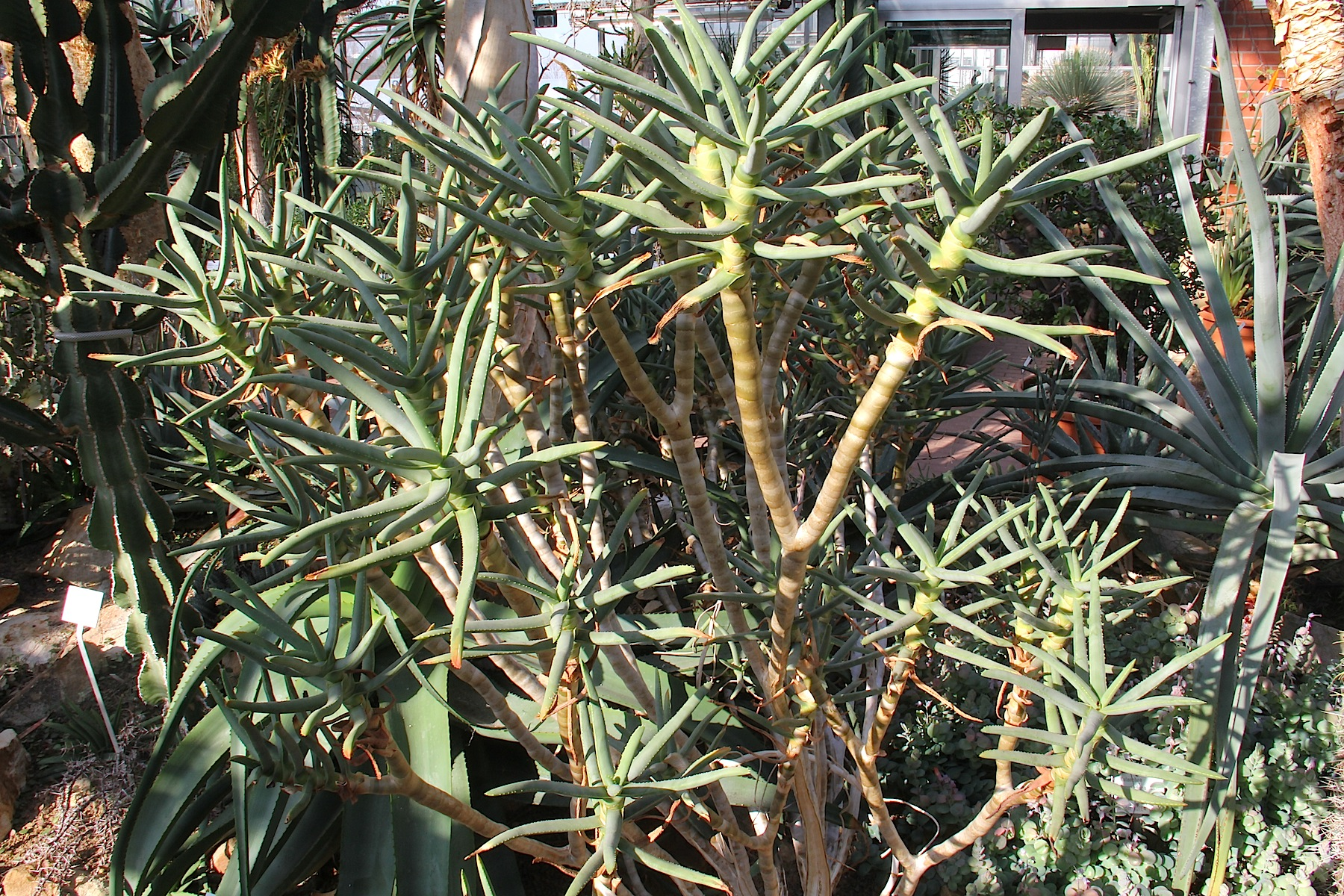
Form

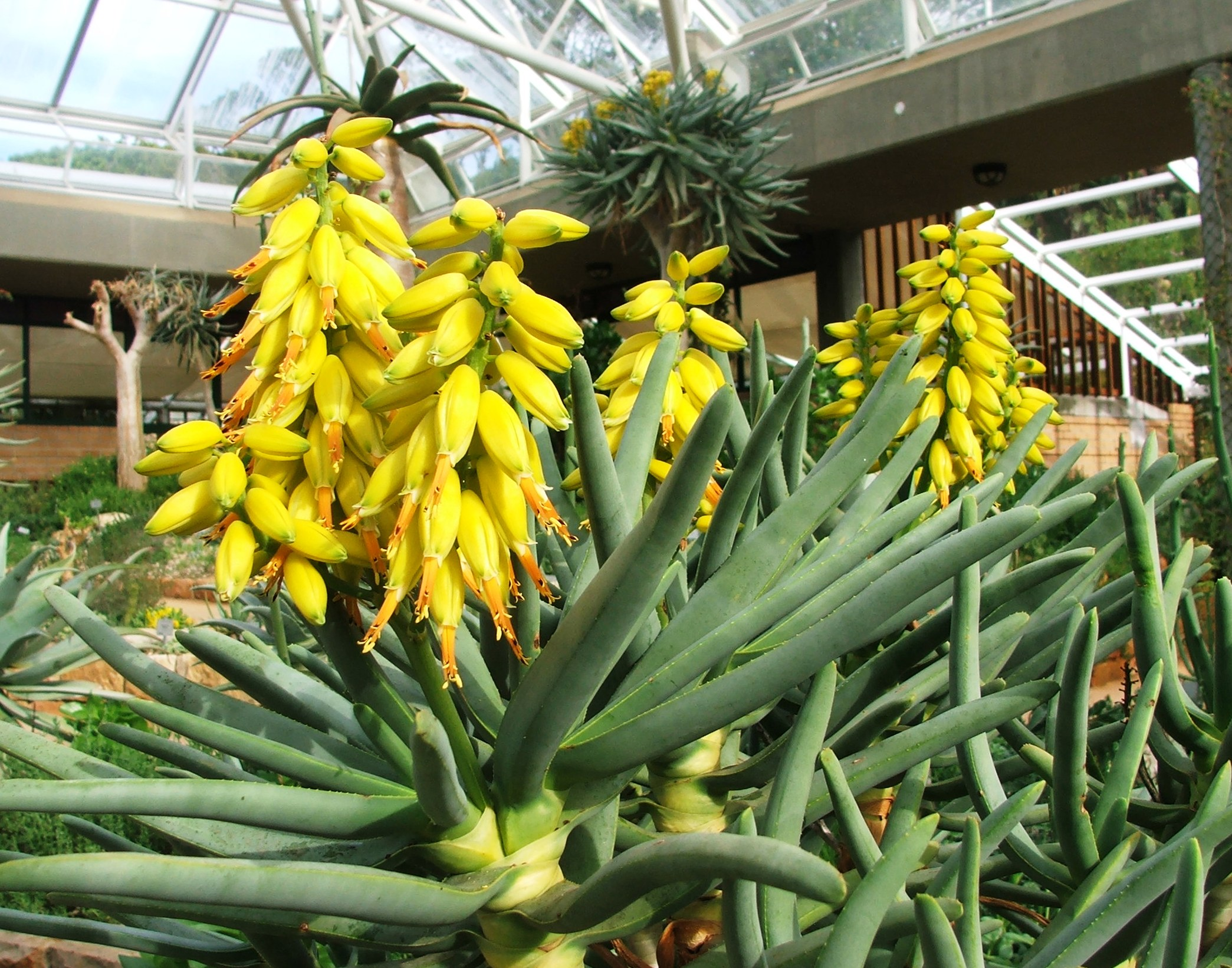
In flower

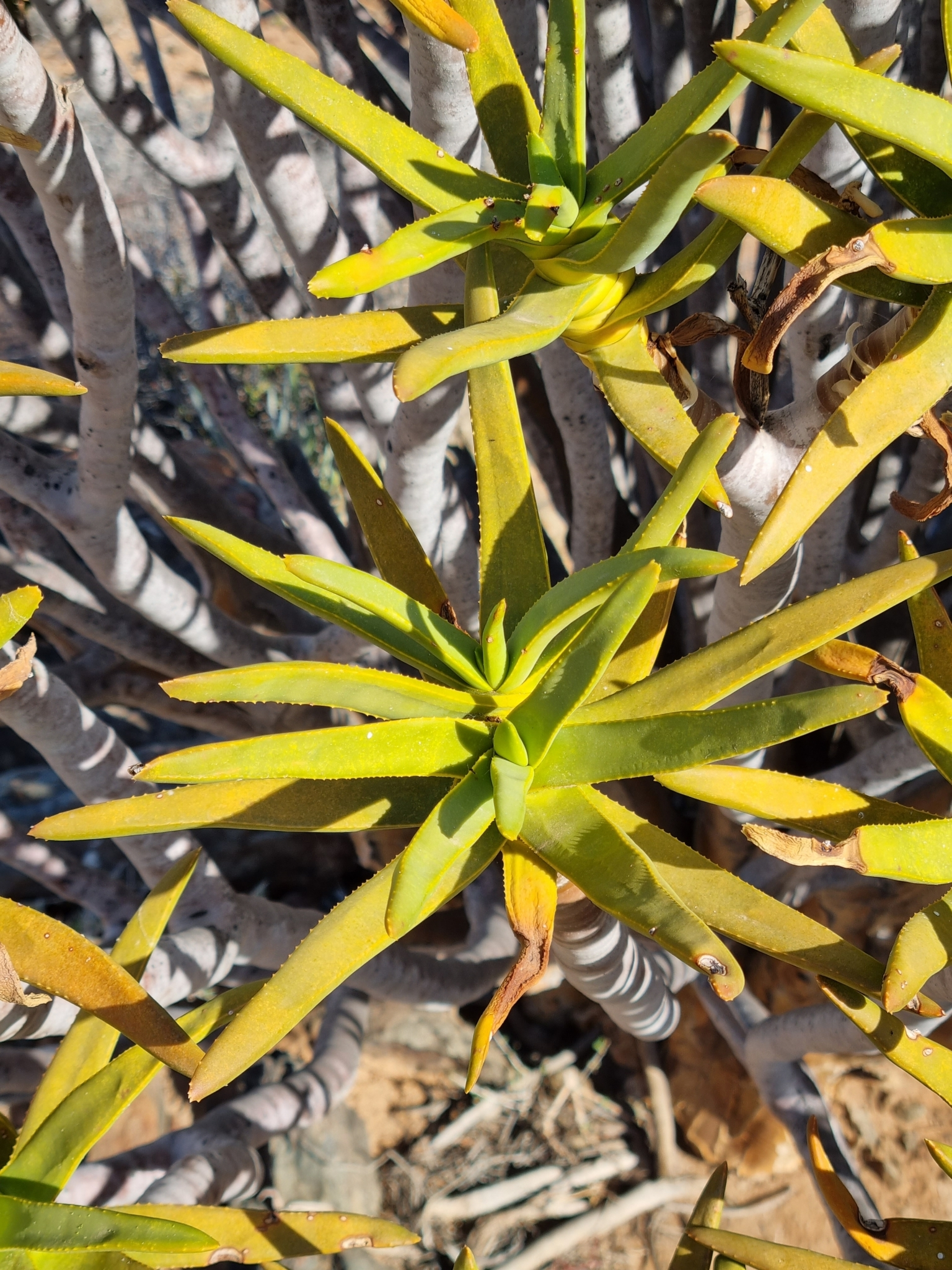
Leaves
