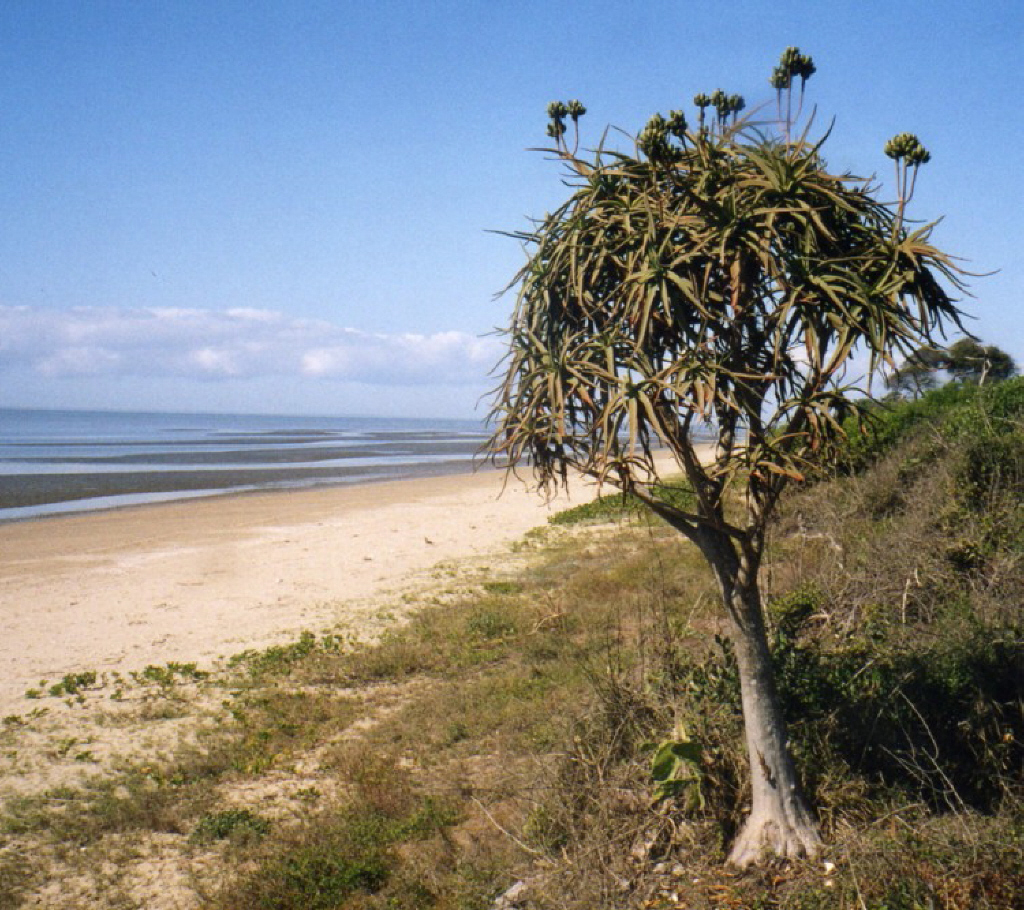

Scientific classification
- Kingdom: Plantae
- Clade: Tracheophytes
- Clade: Angiosperms
- Clade: Monocots
- Order: Asparagales
- Family: Asphodelaceae
- Subfamily: Asphodeloideae
- Tribe: Aloeae
- Genus: Aloidendron
- Species: A. tongaense

Binomial name
- Aloidendron tongaense (van Jaarsv.) Klopper & Gideon F.Sm.
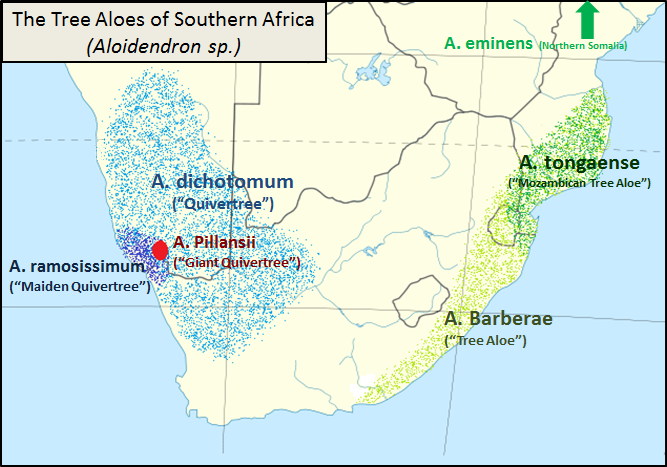
- The distribution of Aloidendron tongaense (dark green) in southern Africa

Synonyms
- Aloe tongaensis van Jaarsv.

= Aloidendron tongaense =

Species of tree

Aloidendron tongaense, formerly Aloe tongaensis, is a species of plant in the genus Aloidendron, native to sandy tropical coastal forests in KwaZulu-Natal, at the border between Mozambique and South Africa, and Mozambique.

== Description ==
It grows as a massive, branching tree, almost as tall as its larger and more widespread relative, the giant tree aloe Aloidendron barberae. It looks similar to A. barberae, however its leaves are slightly more yellow, and it produces bright red flowers.

== Flowers ==
Orange flowers on a branched inflorescence that has a short raceme that are curved down. Tubular like all Aloidendron flowers.

== Gallery ==
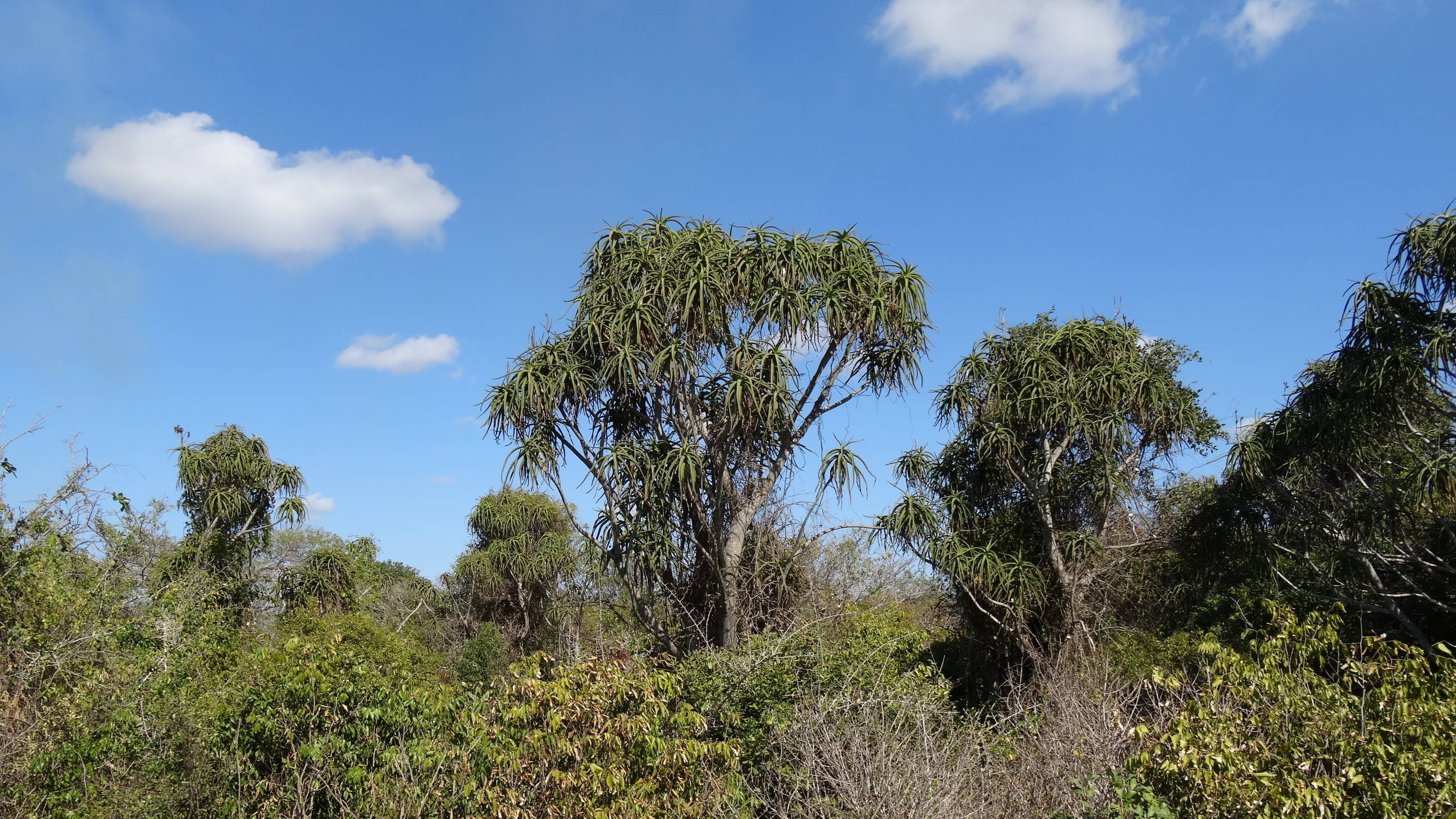

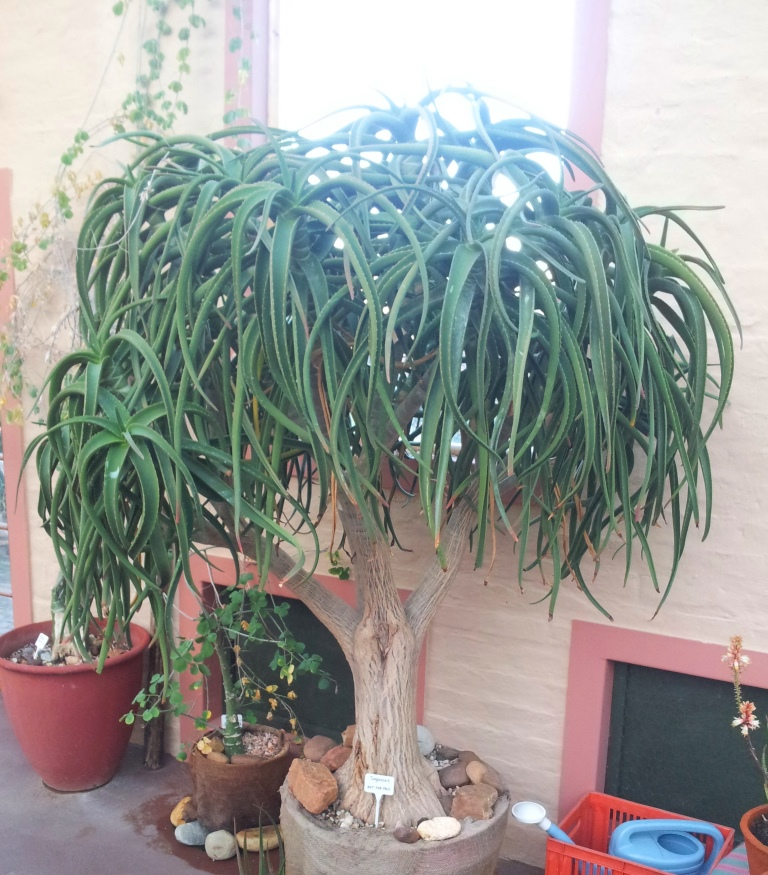
Small plant in cultivation

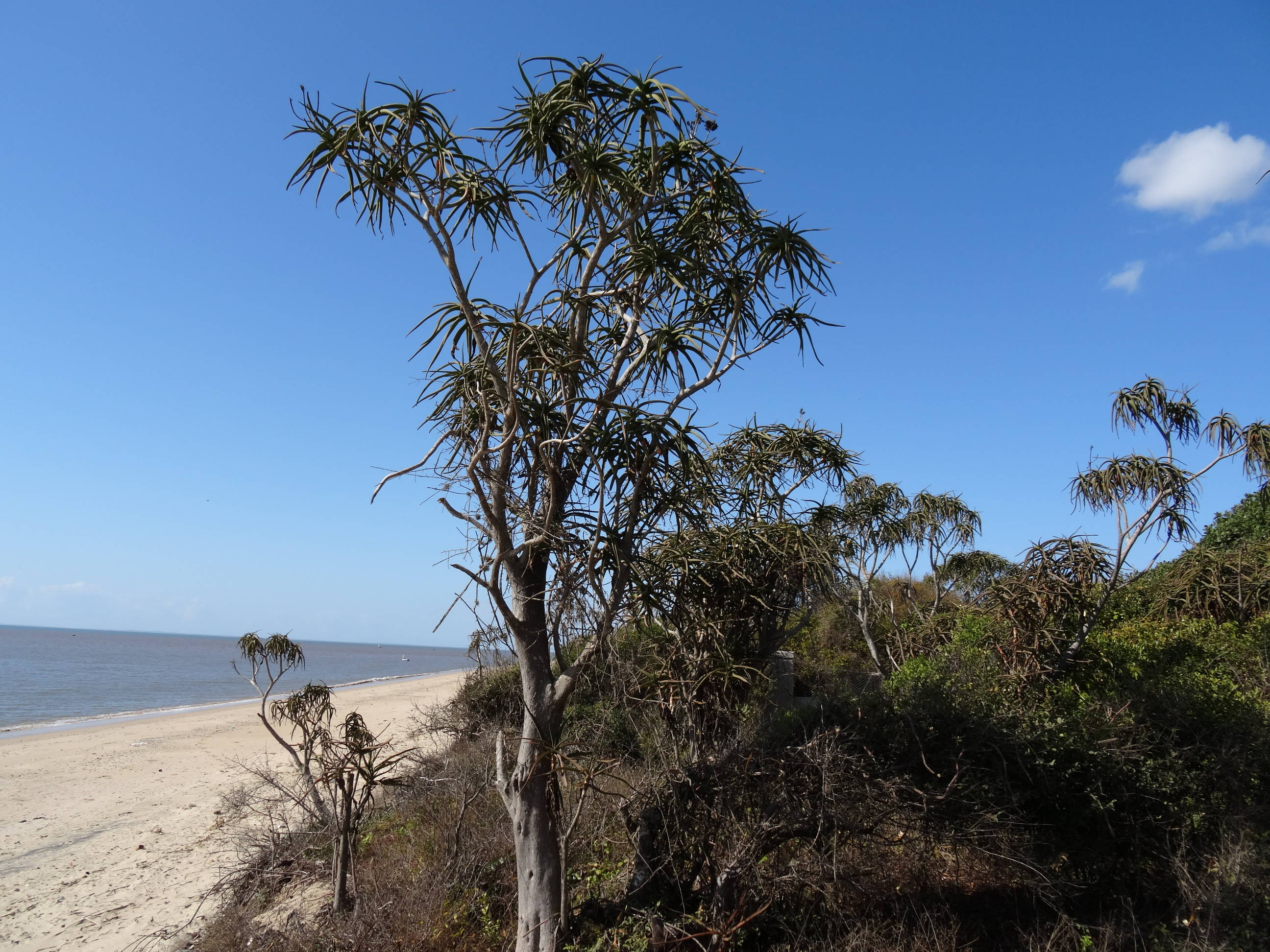

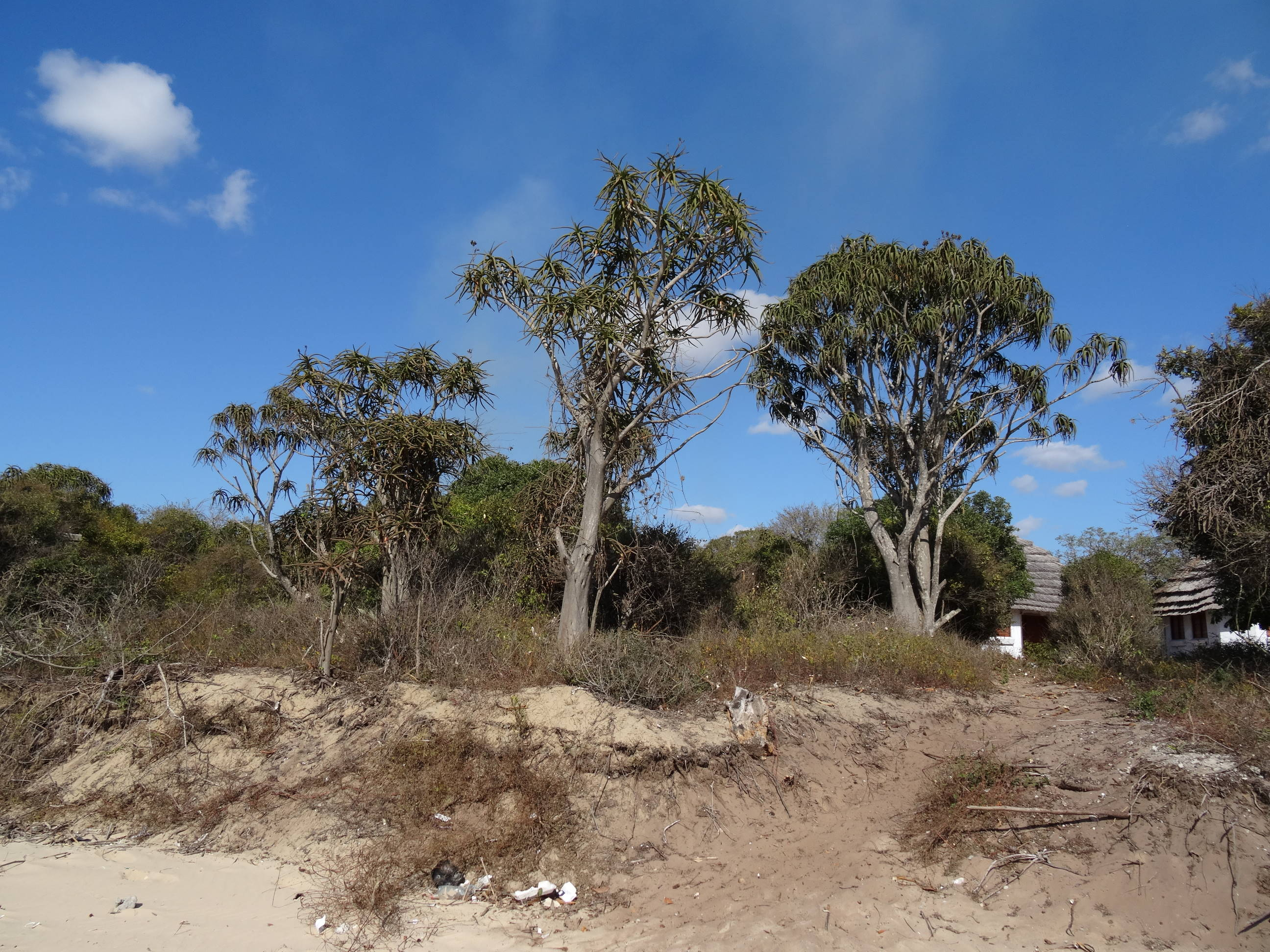
