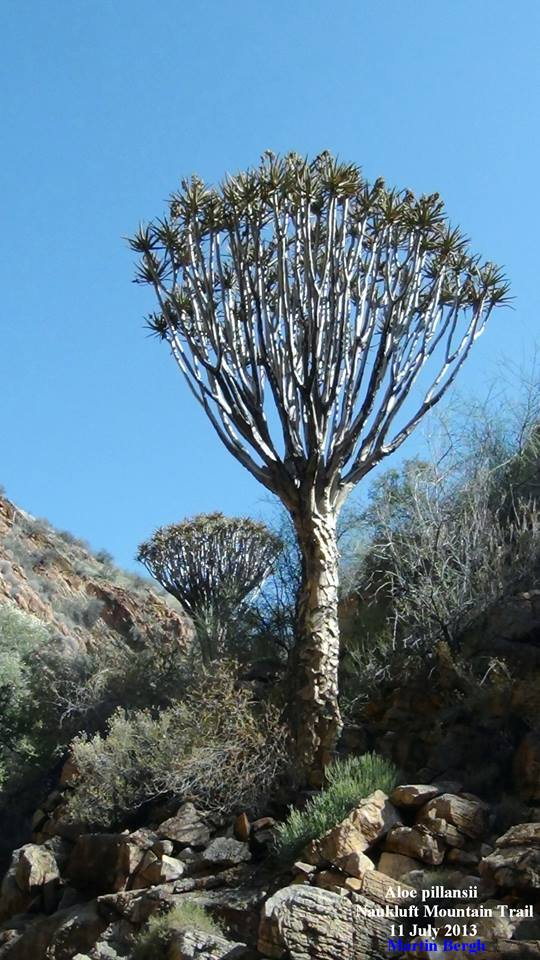

Conservation status
- Critically Endangered (IUCN 3.1)
- CITES Appendix I

Scientific classification
- Kingdom: Plantae
- Clade: Tracheophytes
- Clade: Angiosperms
- Clade: Monocots
- Order: Asparagales
- Family: Asphodelaceae
- Subfamily: Asphodeloideae
- Tribe: Aloeae
- Genus: Aloidendron
- Species: A. pillansii

Binomial name
- Aloidendron pillansii (L.Guthrie) Klopper & Gideon F.Sm.
- Aloidendron pillansii range Extant (resident)

Synonyms
- Aloe pillansii L.Guthrie; Aloe dichotoma subsp. pillansii (L.Guthrie) Zonn.

= Aloidendron pillansii =

Species of tree

Aloidendron pillansii, formerly Aloe pillansii, the giant quiver tree or bastard quiver tree, is a large, branching species of succulent plant indigenous to southern Africa. It is regarded as critically endangered.

== Description ==
Aloidendron pillansii grows up to 15 m in height. It branches dichotomously, and superficially resembles Aloidendron dichotomum. It can be distinguished by its paler, wider, recurved leaves, and its taller, more sparsely branched growth form. The branches are made of a fiber that is soft and penetrable, which allows them to store water. Because of its habitat, Aloidendron pillansii can shed branches and leaves that are deemed detrimental to its survival.

Its round, bright yellow flowers are pendant, and hang down below the rosette (unlike those of the other tree aloes). They appear in Spring.

== Distribution ==
It is found around the border between Namibia and South Africa, where its natural habitat is upper mountain slopes, in the arid winter-rainfall Richtersveld shrubland. It is severely threatened by habitat loss, illegal collecting, and livestock grazing. The species will not survive without intervention.

== Cultivation ==
It rarely appears in cultivation, as it is an extremely slow growing species, and difficult to cultivate.

It requires full sun, extremely well-drained rocky mineral soil, and very dry conditions. In habitat, it grows on rocky slopes in a desert region which receives its sparse rainfall predominantly in the winter.
