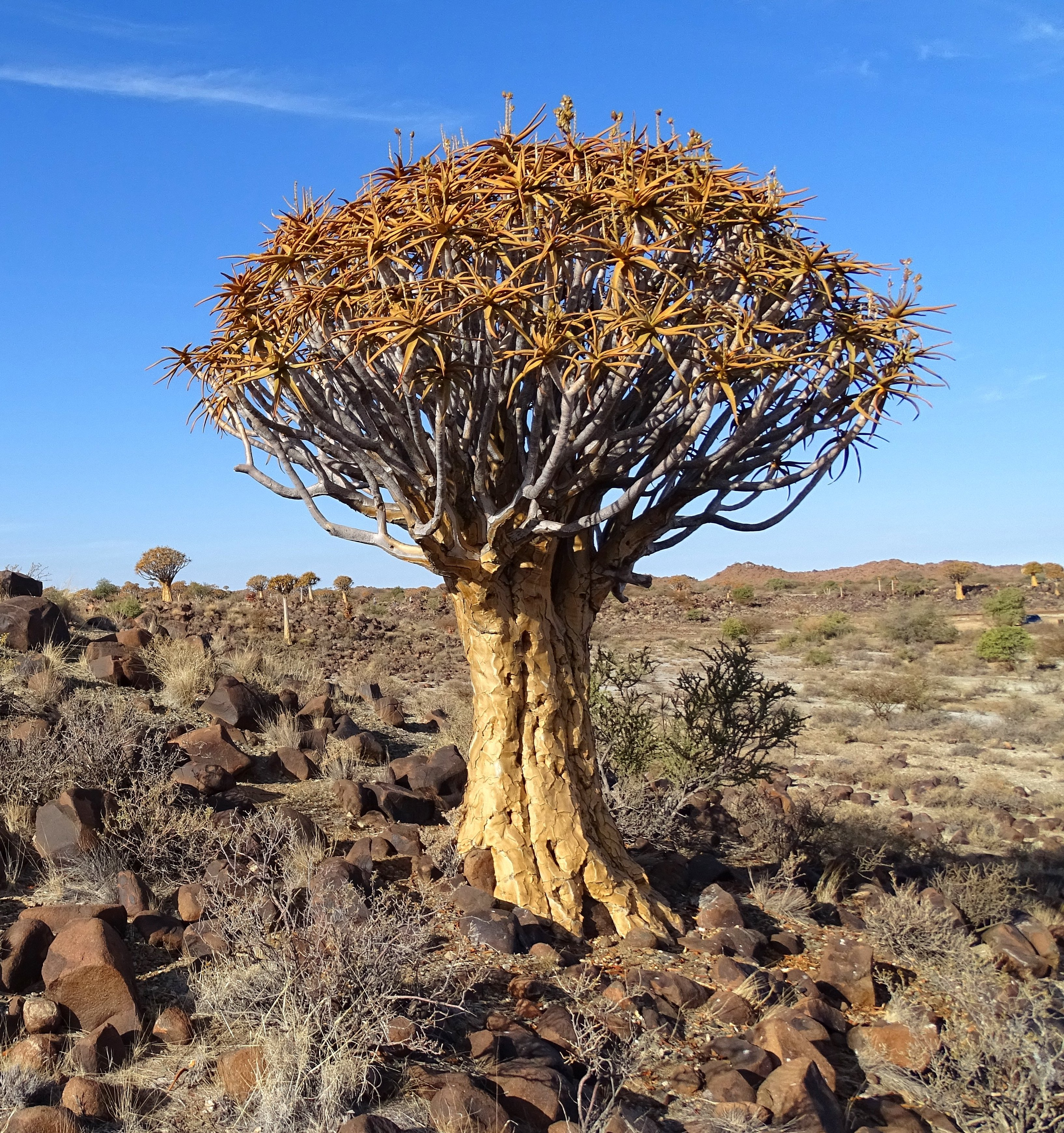

Conservation status
- Vulnerable (IUCN 3.1)

Scientific classification
- Kingdom: Plantae
- Clade: Tracheophytes
- Clade: Angiosperms
- Clade: Monocots
- Order: Asparagales
- Family: Asphodelaceae
- Subfamily: Asphodeloideae
- Genus: Aloidendron
- Species: A. dichotomum

Binomial name
- Aloidendron dichotomum (Masson) Klopper & Gideon F.Sm.
- Aloidendron dichotomum range Extant (resident)
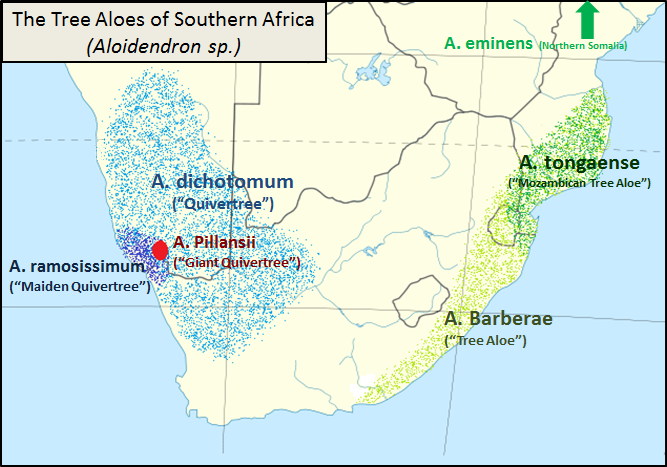
- The distribution of Aloidendron dichotomum (light blue) in southern Africa

Synonyms
- Aloe dichotoma Masson; Rhipidodendrum dichotomum (Masson) Willd.; Aloe ramosa Haw.; Aloe montana Schinz; Aloe dichotoma var. montana (Schinz) A.Berger

= Aloidendron dichotomum =

Quiver tree

Species of tree

Aloidendron dichotomum, formerly Aloe dichotoma, the quiver tree or kokerboom, is a tall, branching species of succulent plant, indigenous to Southern Africa, specifically in the Northern Cape province of South Africa, and parts of Southern Namibia.

== Naming ==
Known as choje to the indigenous San people, the quiver tree gets its English common name from the San people practice of hollowing out the tubular branches of Aloidendron dichotomum to form quivers for their arrows. The specific epithet "dichotomum" refers to how the stems repeatedly branch into two ("dichotomous" branching) as the plant grows. This species was moved to the genus Aloidendron as Aloidendron dichotomum in 2013.

== Related species ==
Three separate species, A. dichotomum, A. pillansii and A. ramosissimum inhabit the same arid areas of the Richtersveld and the Namib Desert around the South African-Namibian border. The three have been given different ratings on the IUCN Red List of Threatened Species: 'vulnerable' for A. dichotomum, 'critically endangered' for A. pillansii and 'endangered' for A. ramosissimum.

The three species can be distinguished as follows: In A. pillansii, the inflorescences hang from below the lowest leaves, rather than growing erect. A. ramosissimum is considerably smaller—rarely reaching more than 2 m in height—and assumes a more shrub-like shape. While there is a gradation between tree-like A. dichotomum and the shrubby A. ramosissimum, the relatively unique A. pillansii population is separated by a different flowering time and therefore does not interbreed with the other two species.

== Distribution and conservation ==
One of the few examples of spontaneous forests of A. dichotomum is the Quiver Tree Forest, about 14 km north of Keetmanshoop, in Namibia. Another is located in the Northern Cape of South Africa at Gannabos.

Throughout much of its range this species is in decline. Modelling of Aloidendron dichotomum in South Africa and Namibia has contributed to understanding the needs of protected areas in response to climate change. Modelled range declines in this species due to climate change have recently been confirmed by field surveys.

== Cultivation ==
Aloidendron dichotomum is cultivated in arid areas around the world, for use in landscaping. The slow growth rate and relative rarity of the plant make it a particularly expensive specimen. It is also relatively difficult to keep outside of its natural habitat.

In cultivation it requires extremely well-drained coarse mineral sand (preferably with some loam and bone meal to keep it active and growing), full sun, good aeration and extremely little water - primarily in the winter (as it mainly occurs in winter rainfall desert areas). In the (rare) event that it is under-watered, the leaves will curl up and die off at the tips; this is not fatal, but indicates that it is relatively dry.

It is unusually prone to aphids and insect infections in between its leaves, and this is exacerbated whenever there is not full sun and constant fresh air movement. Indoor plants require frequent treatment for these pests. Fungicide can be added occasionally, to protect the plant from rot.

It can be propagated from seed and (with more difficulty) from cuttings or truncheons. Cuttings need to be thoroughly dried for several weeks in a shaded area before being planted.

== In popular culture ==
Michael Benson's book Space Odyssey: Stanley Kubrick, Arthur C. Clarke, and the Making of a Masterpiece (2018) briefly discusses how the kokerboom piqued the interest of film director, Stanley Kubrick. The book claims that several protected kokerboom trees were cut down so they could be used to film 2001: A Space Odyssey.

== Gallery ==
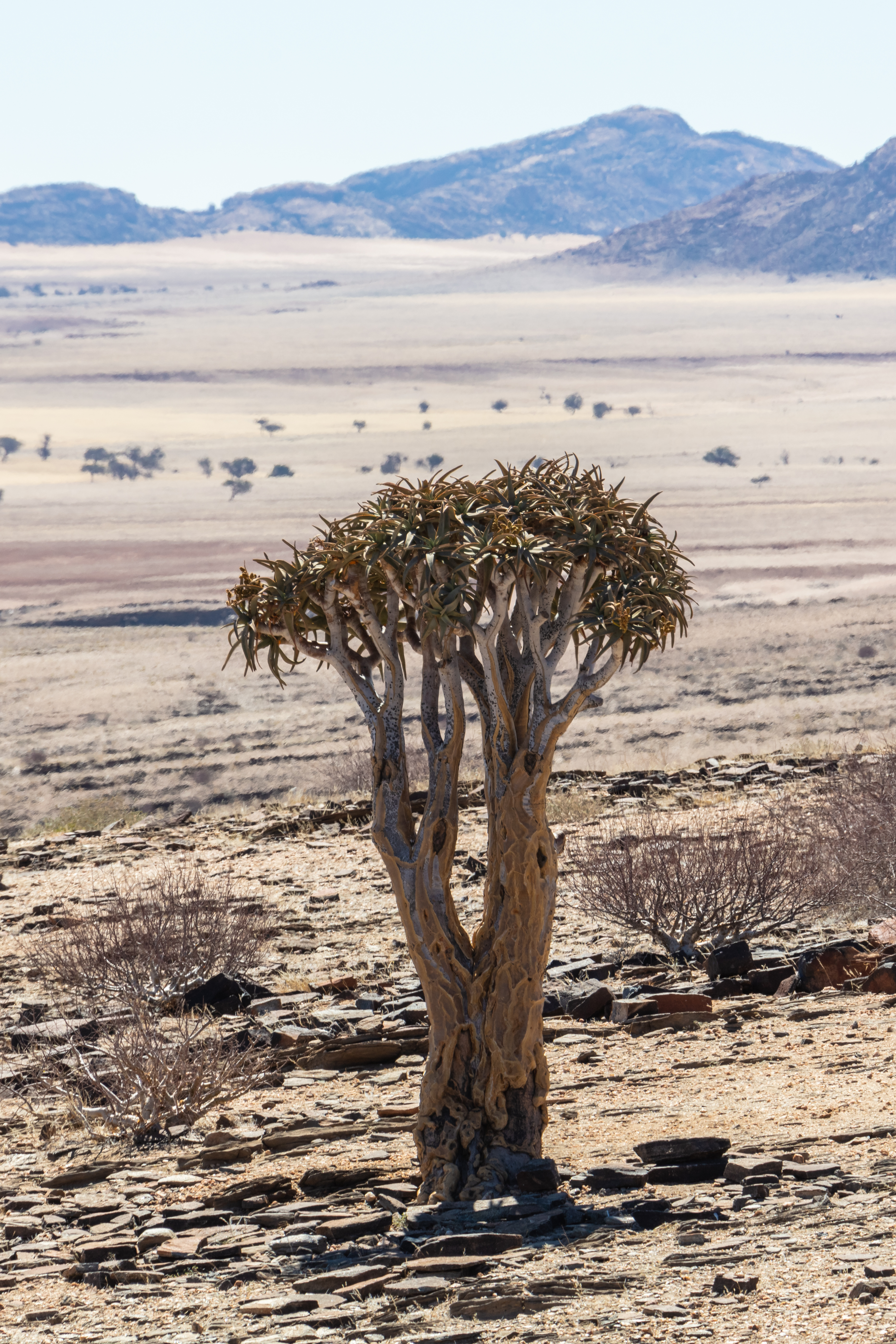
Quiver tree in the Namib-Naukluft National Park, Namibia.

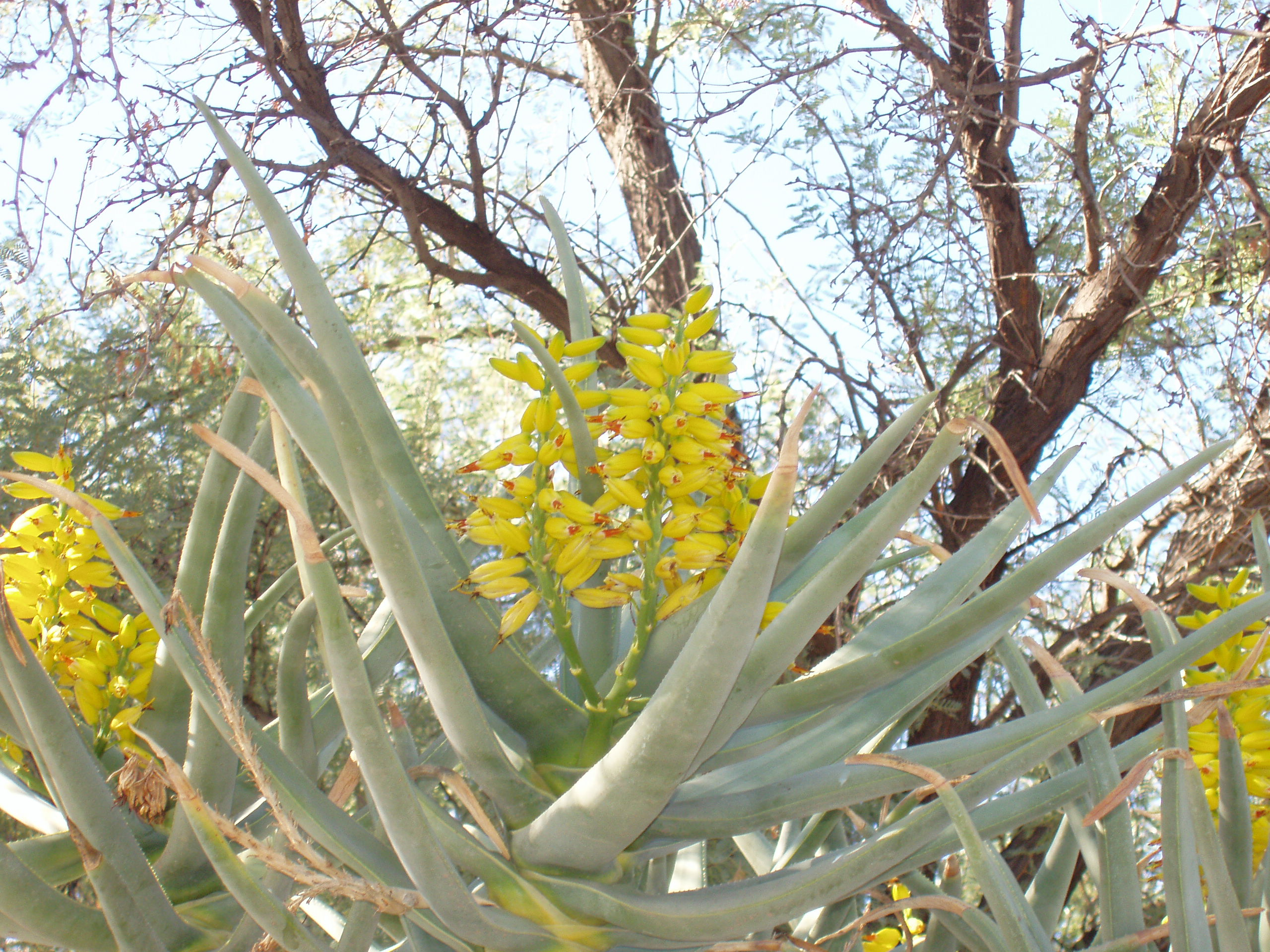
In bloom.

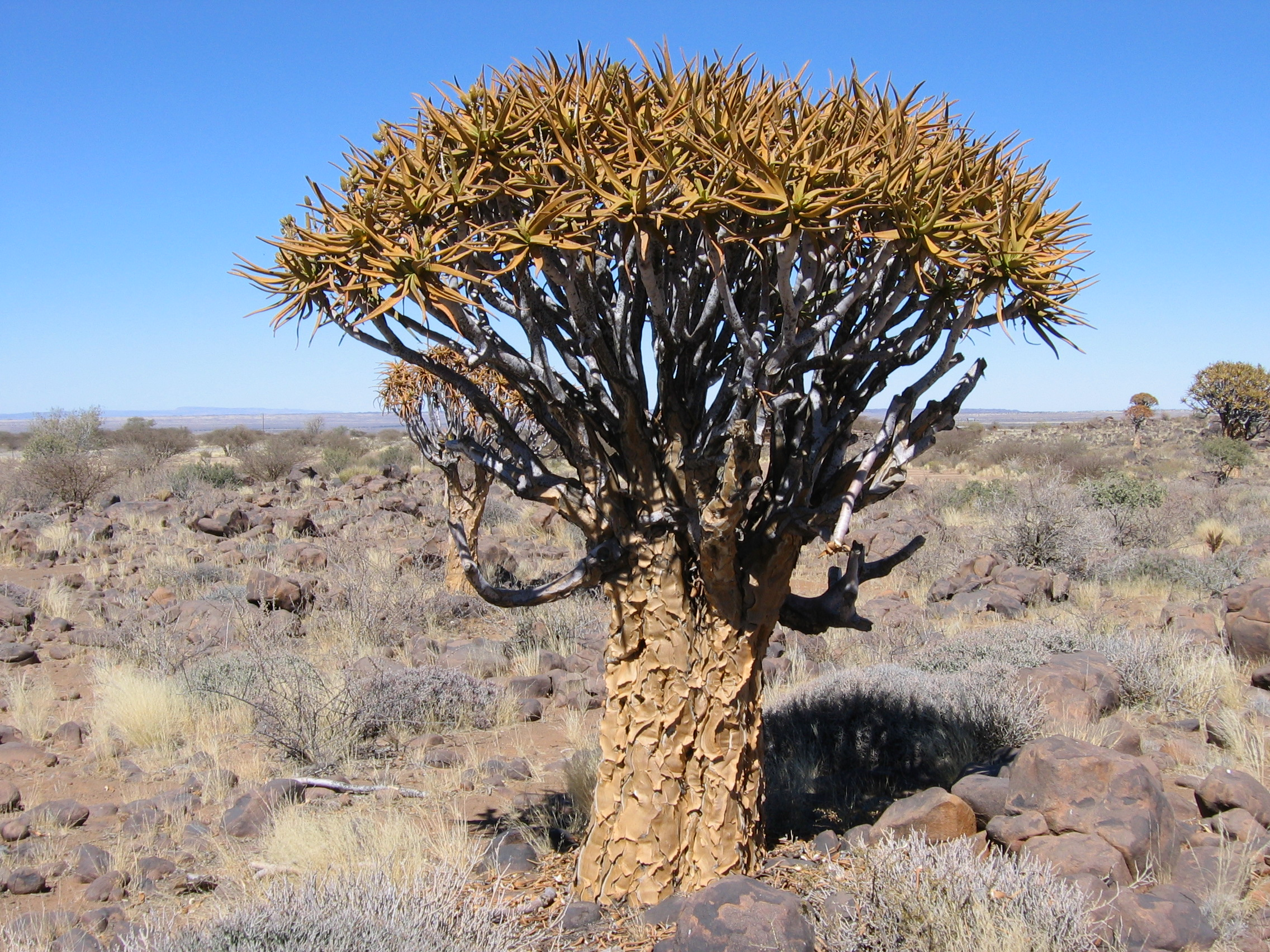
Quiver tree in southern Namibia.

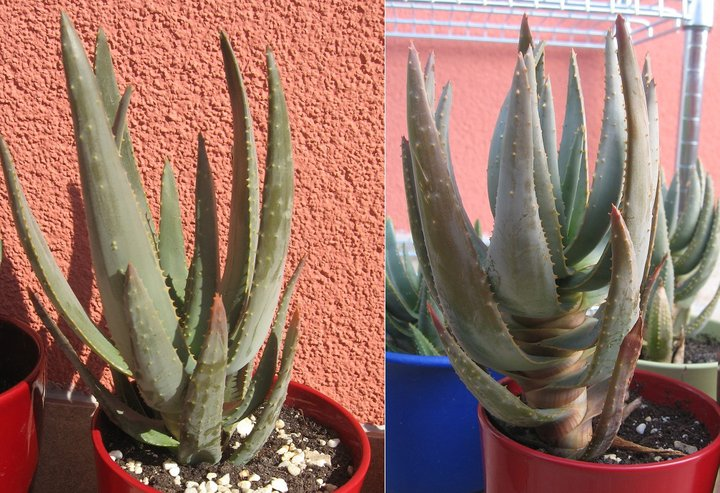
Growth of a young plant from May to August.

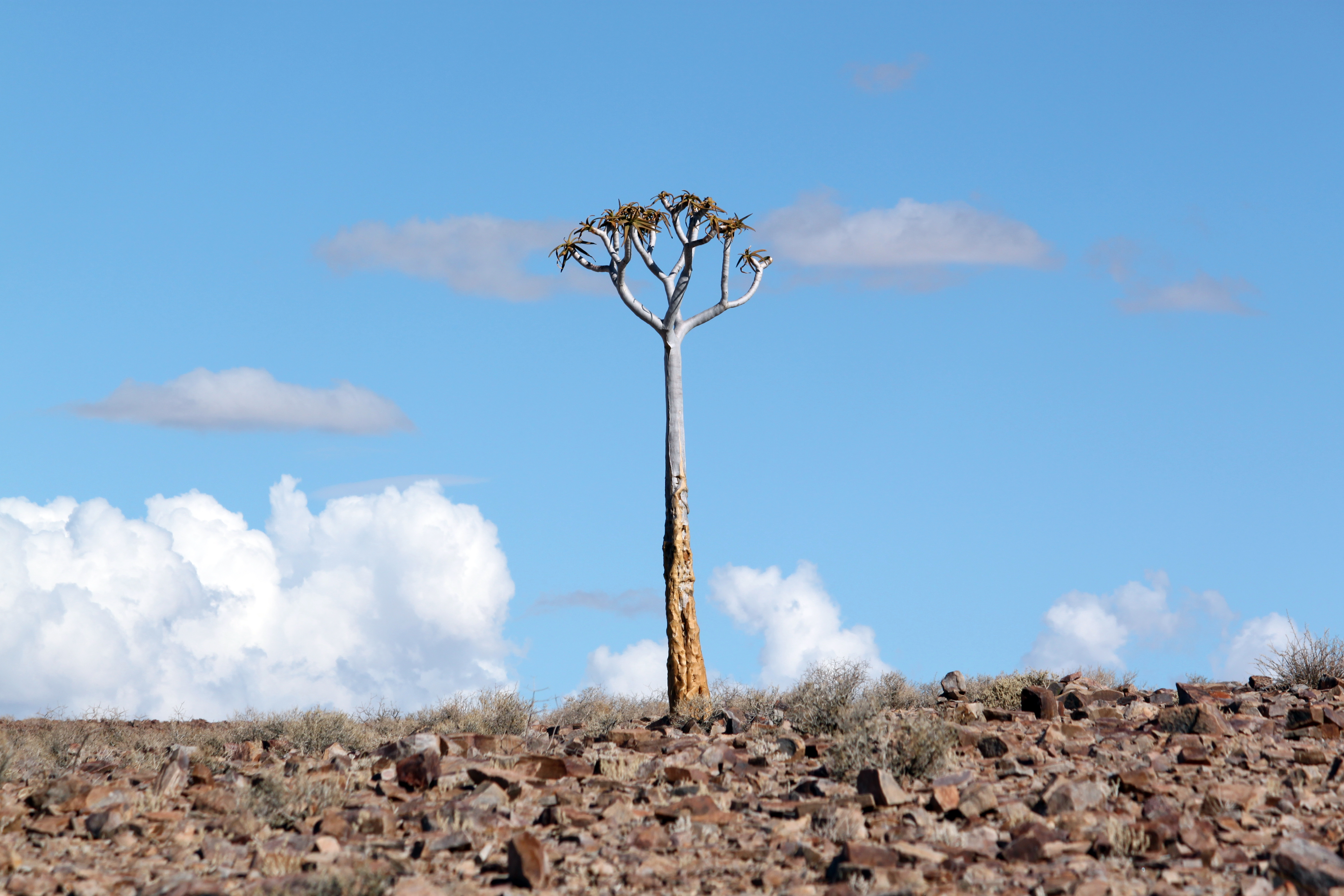
Quiver tree at Fish River Canyon, Namibia.

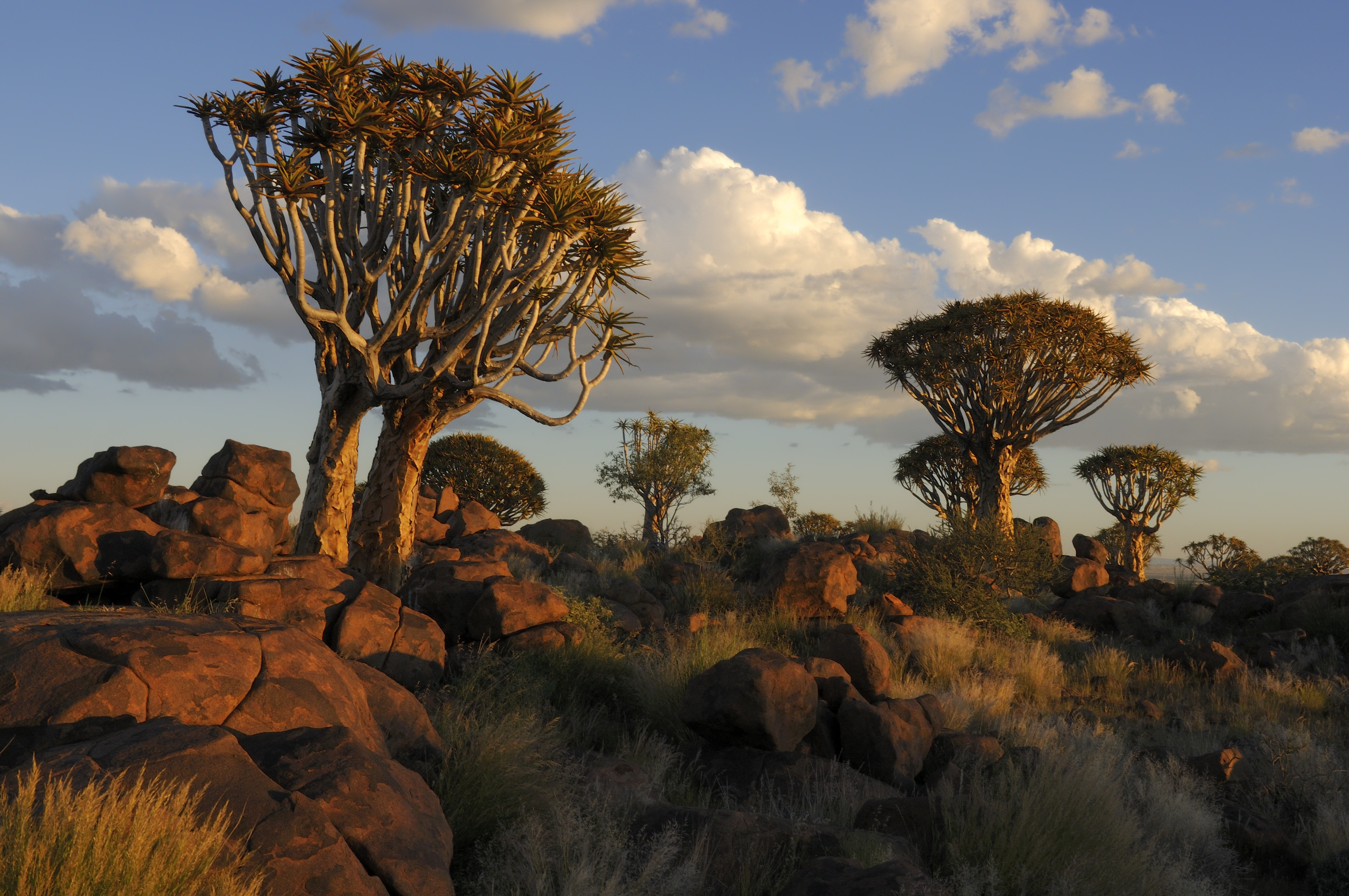
Quiver Tree Forest near Keetmanshoop, Namibia, in the evening.

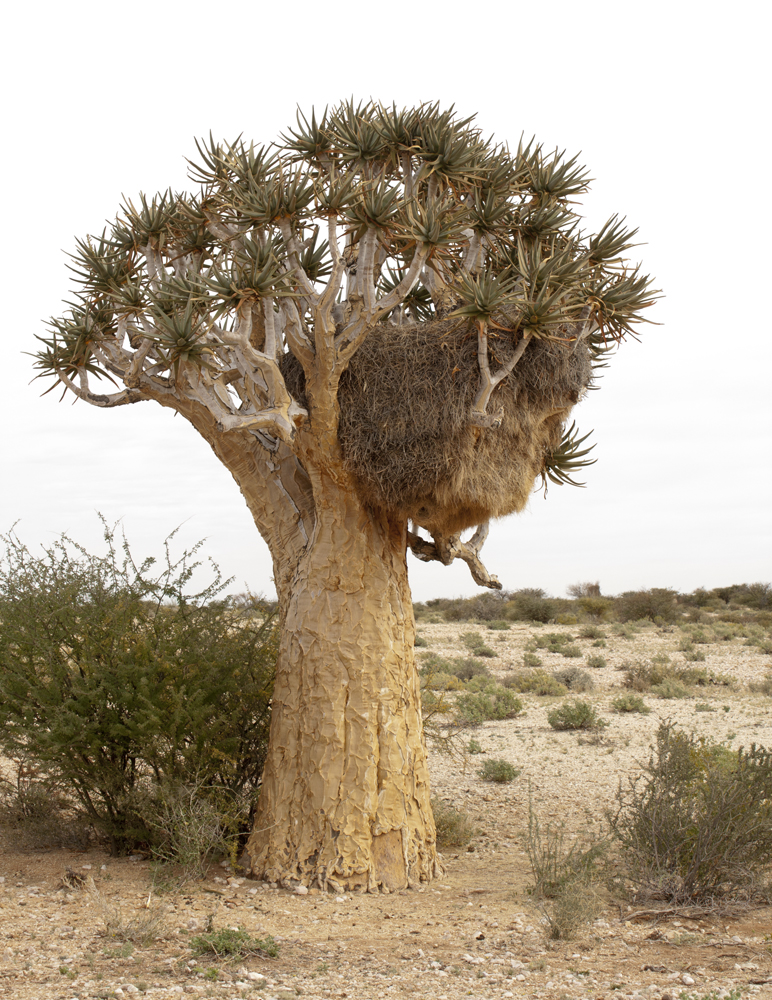
Sociable Weaver (Philetairus socius) nest in a Quiver tree. Northern Cape, South Africa.

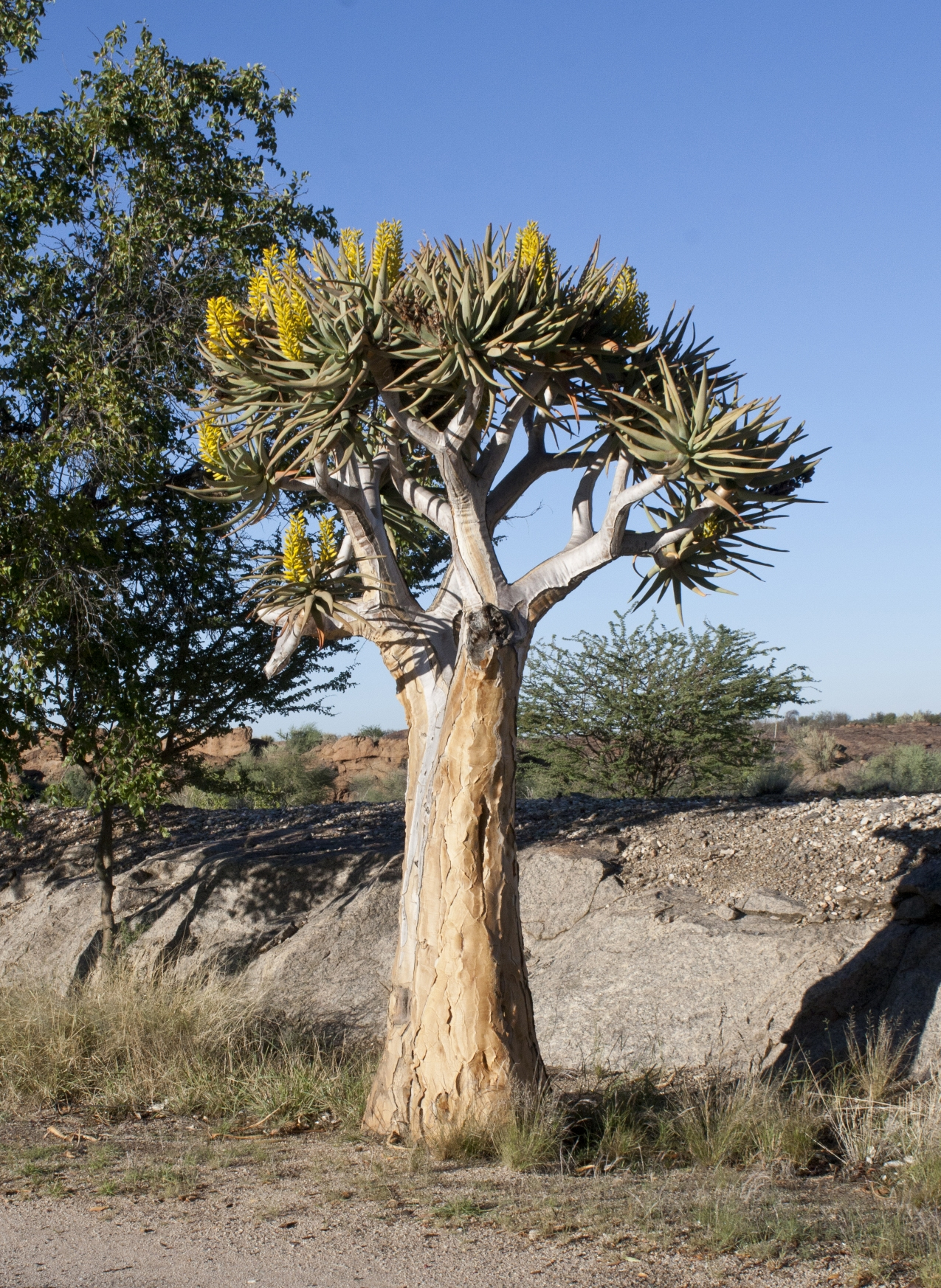
Quiver tree in flower in the Augrabies National Park, South Africa.

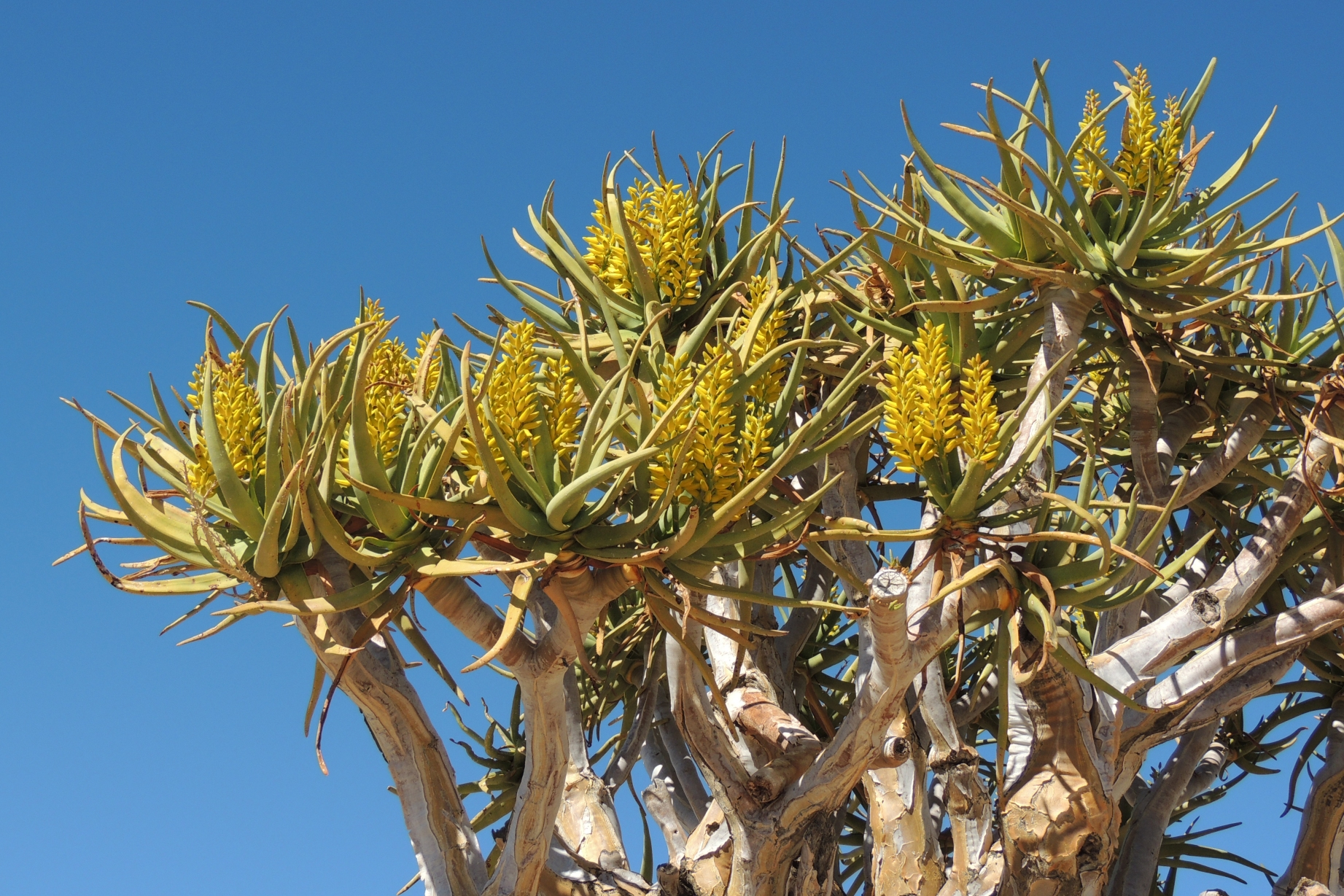
The flowers of the Quiver tree in May. Augrabies National Park, South Africa.

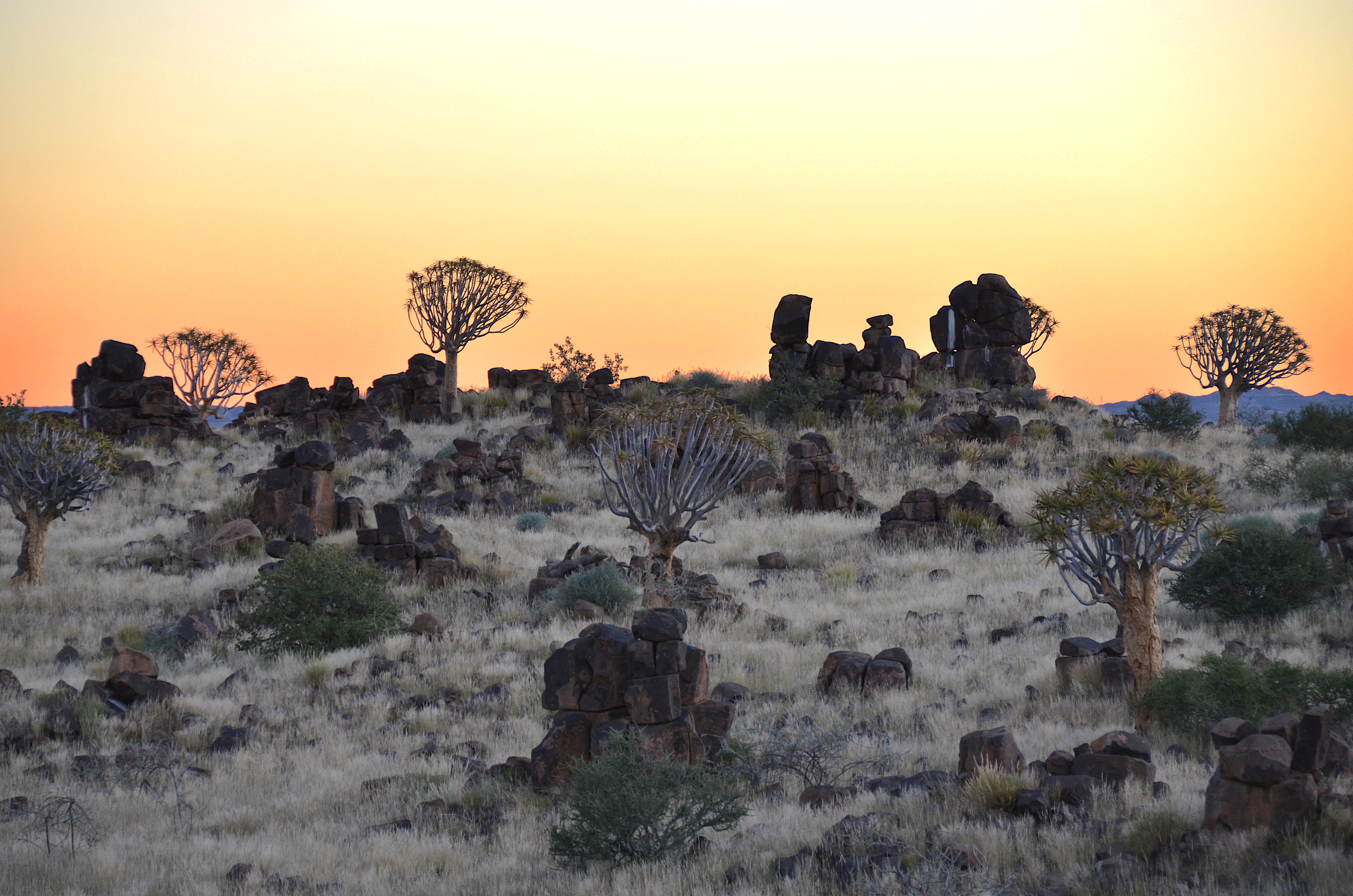
Quiver trees and Dolerite rocks near Keetmanshoop.

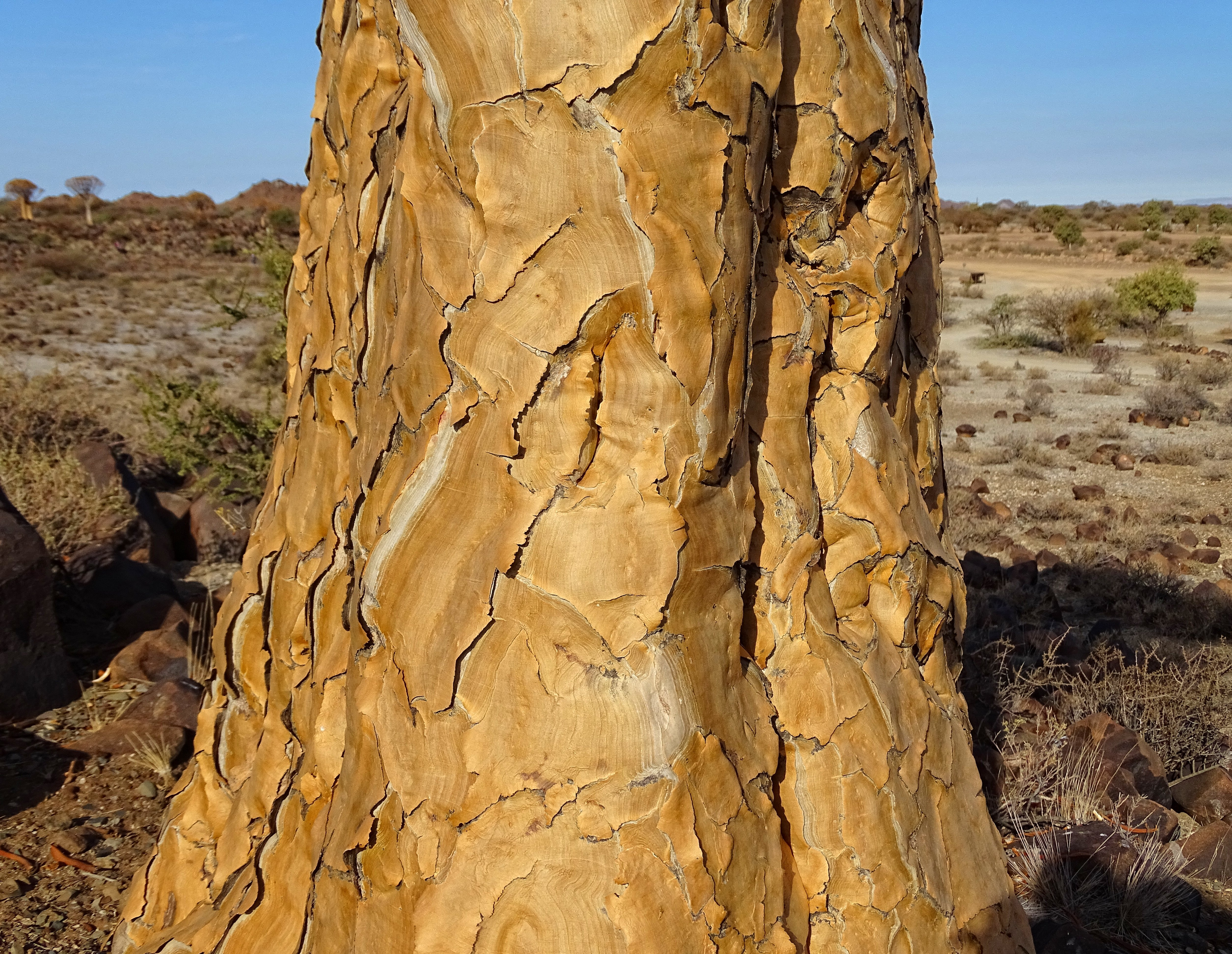
Close-up photo of bark on a quiver tree.

== See also ==
- Aloidendron barberae
