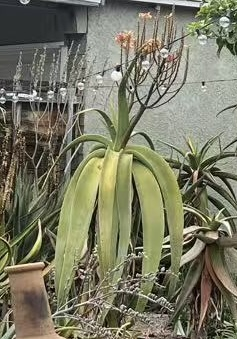

Scientific classification
- Kingdom: Plantae
- Clade: Tracheophytes
- Clade: Angiosperms
- Clade: Monocots
- Order: Asparagales
- Family: Asphodelaceae
- Subfamily: Asphodeloideae
- Tribe: Aloeae
- Genus: Aloidendron
- Species: A. sabaeum

Binomial name
- Aloidendron sabaeum (Schweinf.) Boatwr. & J.C.Manning

Synonyms
- Aloe sabaea Schweinf.; Aloe gillilandii Reynolds

= Aloidendron sabaeum =

Species of flowering plant

Aloidendron sabaeum (syn. Aloe sabaea) is a species of flowering plant belonging to the subfamily Asphodeloideae. It is native to Saudi Arabia and Yemen.
