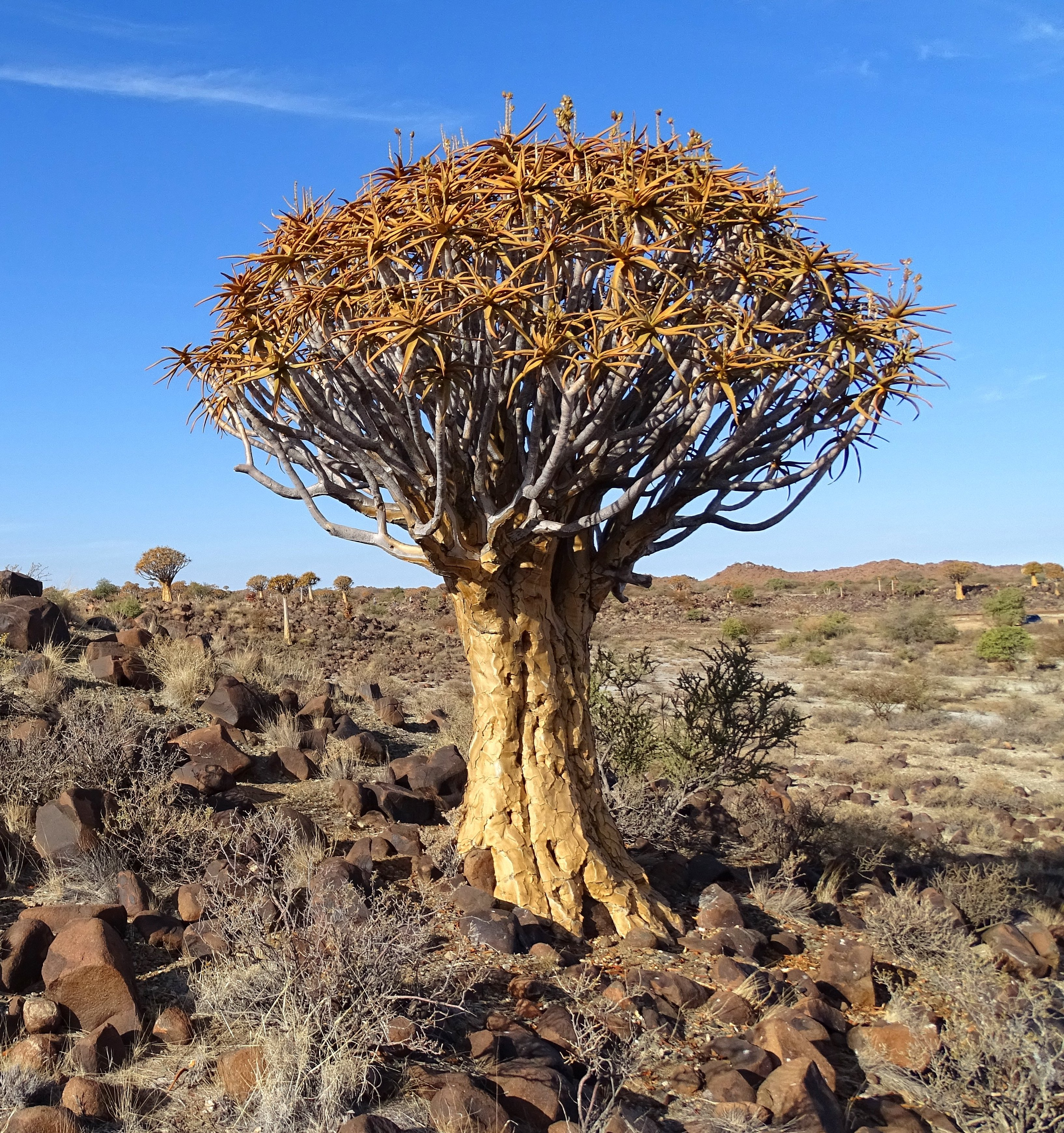
- Aloidendron dichotomum

Scientific classification
- Kingdom: Plantae
- Clade: Embryophytes
- Clade: Tracheophytes
- Clade: Angiosperms
- Clade: Monocots
- Order: Asparagales
- Family: Asphodelaceae
- Subfamily: Asphodeloideae
- Tribe: Aloeae
- Genus: Aloidendron (A.Berger) Klopper & Gideon F.Sm.

Type species
- Aloidendron barberae
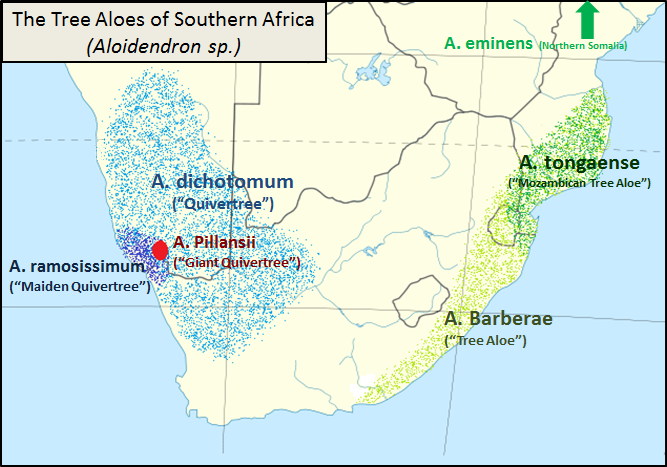
- The distribution of Aloidendron in southern Africa

= Aloidendron =

Genus of flowering plants

Aloidendron is a genus of succulent plants in the subfamily Asphodeloideae. It was split off from the much larger genus Aloe in 2013.

== Taxonomy ==
Phylogenetic studies indicated that several species that were traditionally classed as members of the genus Aloe were genetically distinct and comprised an entirely separate clade. In 2013, the species were accordingly split off as a separate genus, Aloidendron, a decision that was confirmed by Manning et al. in 2014.

== Range ==
Select IUCN distribution; Aloidendron dichotomum; Aloidendron ramosissimum; Aloidendron pillansii

=== Species ===
As of October 2017, the World Checklist of Selected Plant Families accepts the following species:

Image	Scientific name	Distribution
	Aloidendron barberae (Dyer) Klopper & Gideon F.Sm.	Eastern Cape through the former Transkei, KwaZulu-Natal, Swaziland and Mpumalanga; and northwards to Mozambique and East Africa
	Aloidendron dichotomum (Masson) Klopper & Gideon F.Sm.	north of Keetmanshoop, in Namibia. Northern Cape of South Africa at Gannabos.
	Aloidendron eminens (Reynolds & P.R.O.Bally) Klopper & Gideon F.Sm.	the northern area around Erigavo, Somalia.
	Aloidendron pillansii (L.Guthrie) Klopper & Gideon F.Sm.	Namibia and South Africa
	Aloidendron ramosissimum (Pillans) Klopper & Gideon F.Sm.	between South Africa and Namibia
	Aloidendron sabaeum (Schweinf.) Boatwr. & J.C.Manning	Saudi Arabia and Yemen
	Aloidendron tongaense (van Jaarsv.) Klopper & Gideon F.Sm.	KwaZulu-Natal, at the border between Mozambique and South Africa
