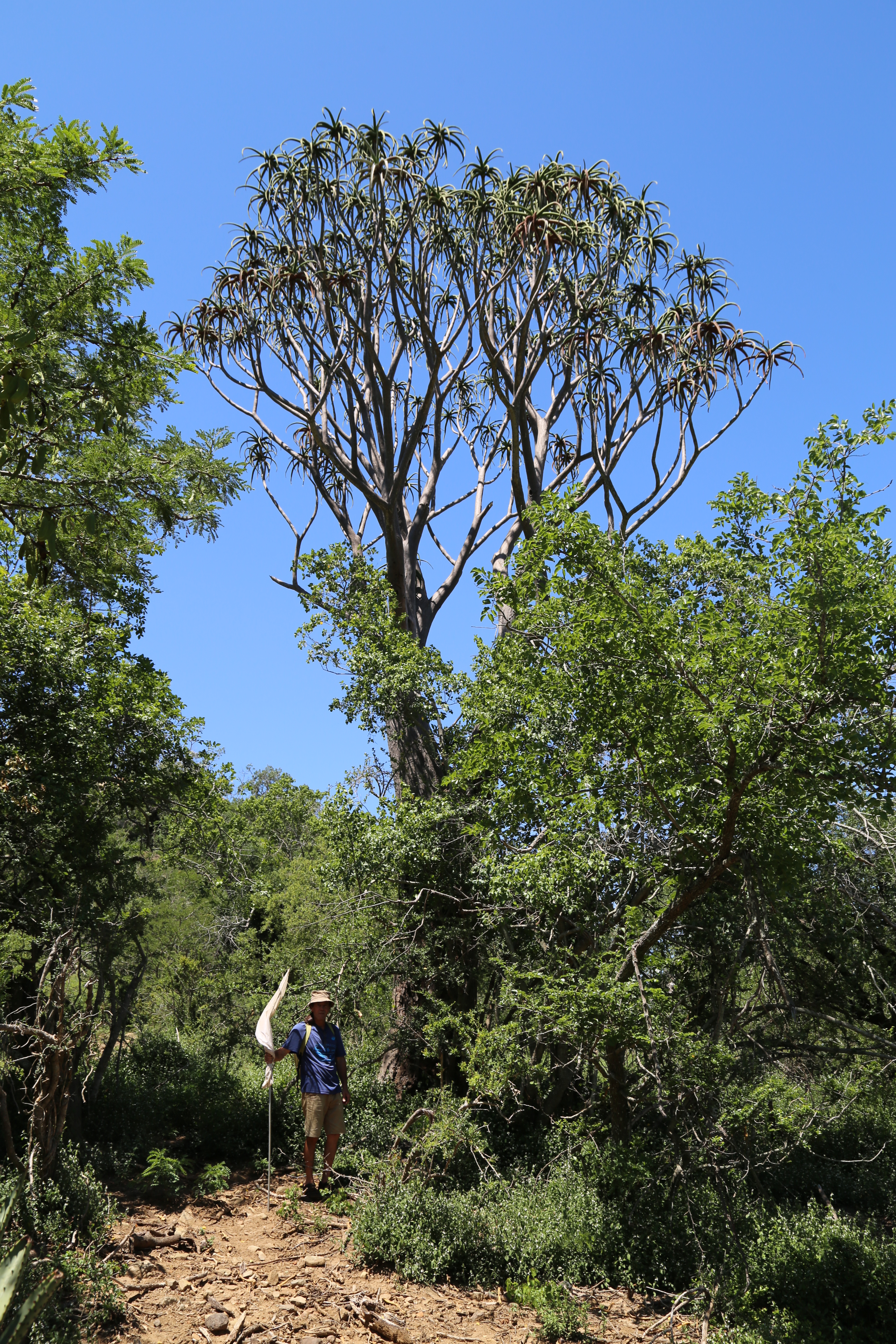
- Aloidendron barberae at Mhlopeni Nature Reserve, KwaZulu-Natal

Scientific classification
- Kingdom: Plantae
- Clade: Tracheophytes
- Clade: Angiosperms
- Clade: Monocots
- Order: Asparagales
- Family: Asphodelaceae
- Subfamily: Asphodeloideae
- Genus: Aloidendron
- Species: A. barberae

Binomial name
- Aloidendron barberae (Dyer) Klopper & Gideon F.Sm.

= Aloidendron barberae =

Tree aloe

Species of tree

Aloidendron barberae, formerly Aloe bainesii and Aloe barberae, also known as the tree aloe, is a species of succulent plant in the genus Aloidendron. It is native to South Africa northwards to Mozambique. In its native climes this slow-growing tree can reach up to 18 metres (59 ft) high and 0.9 m (3 ft) stem in stem diameter. Aloidendron barberae is Africa's largest aloe-like plant. The tree aloe is often used as an ornamental plant. Its tubular flowers are rose pink (green-tipped); it flowers in winter and in its natural environment is pollinated by sunbirds.

== Taxonomy ==
Aloidendron barberae was first collected and submitted for classification by Mary Elizabeth Barber, who was a plant collector in the former Transkei. She sent specimens of the plant and its flowers to the Royal Botanic Gardens at Kew, where in 1874 it was named by William Turner Thiselton-Dyer (1843–1928) in her honour. Subsequently, it was also found in KwaZulu-Natal by the well known traveller, explorer and painter Thomas Baines in 1873. He also sent a specimen to Kew, where it was named Aloe bainesii. Although it was known as A. bainseii for many years, Aloe barberae was the name first given to this plant, and takes precedence according to the International Code of Botanical Nomenclature, and so is the epithet used in the combination Aloidendron barberae.

== Distribution ==
The tree aloe's habitat is subtropical coastal forests, kloofs (ravines) and dry valleys in the eastern regions of southern Africa. Aloidendron barberae is widely distributed from the Eastern Cape through KwaZulu-Natal, Eswatini and Mpumalanga; and northwards to Mozambique and East Africa.

== Cultivation ==
Aloidendron barberae forms a striking focal point in the garden, being an enormous sculptural tree with a neat crown. A specimen planted at the Kirstenbosch Botanical Garden in Cape Town in 1922 had by 2011 grown to have a basal diameter (not girth) of 3 m (9.8 ft).

It is easily propagated, especially by cuttings (truncheons) which should be left to dry for a week or two before planting. It prefers well-drained soil, especially on a slope, and can tolerate some shade when small. It should not be planted in between buildings or in spots where its roots will be constrained, as its trunk and roots need to expand and spread.

=== Hybrids and cultivars ===
Several hybrid varieties have been created between this species and its relative Aloidendron dichotomum (the quiver tree) and, more rarely, with Aloe species. These all tend to be more short and compact than pure A. barberae. Some of the more popular hybrids include:

- 'Hercules' (A. barberae × dichotoma), the most common hybrid, with golden-grey trunk, and compact grey leaves.
- 'Rex' (A. barberae × dichotoma), a fast-growing cultivar developed in Swellendam, which has a grey trunk, and more slender grey-green leaves with pink teeth. Seed parent is dichotoma.
- 'Goliath' (A. barberae × Aloe vaombe), a very fast-growing top-heavy hybrid, with a slender trunk and an enormous head of massive rubbery dark-green leaves.
- 'Nick Deinhart' (A. barberae × Aloe speciosa), a new hybrid using A. barberae pollen, with glaucous blue foliage.
- 'Medusa', this is often considered a cultivar, but is in fact the natural Mozambican form of A. barberae.

== Pictures ==
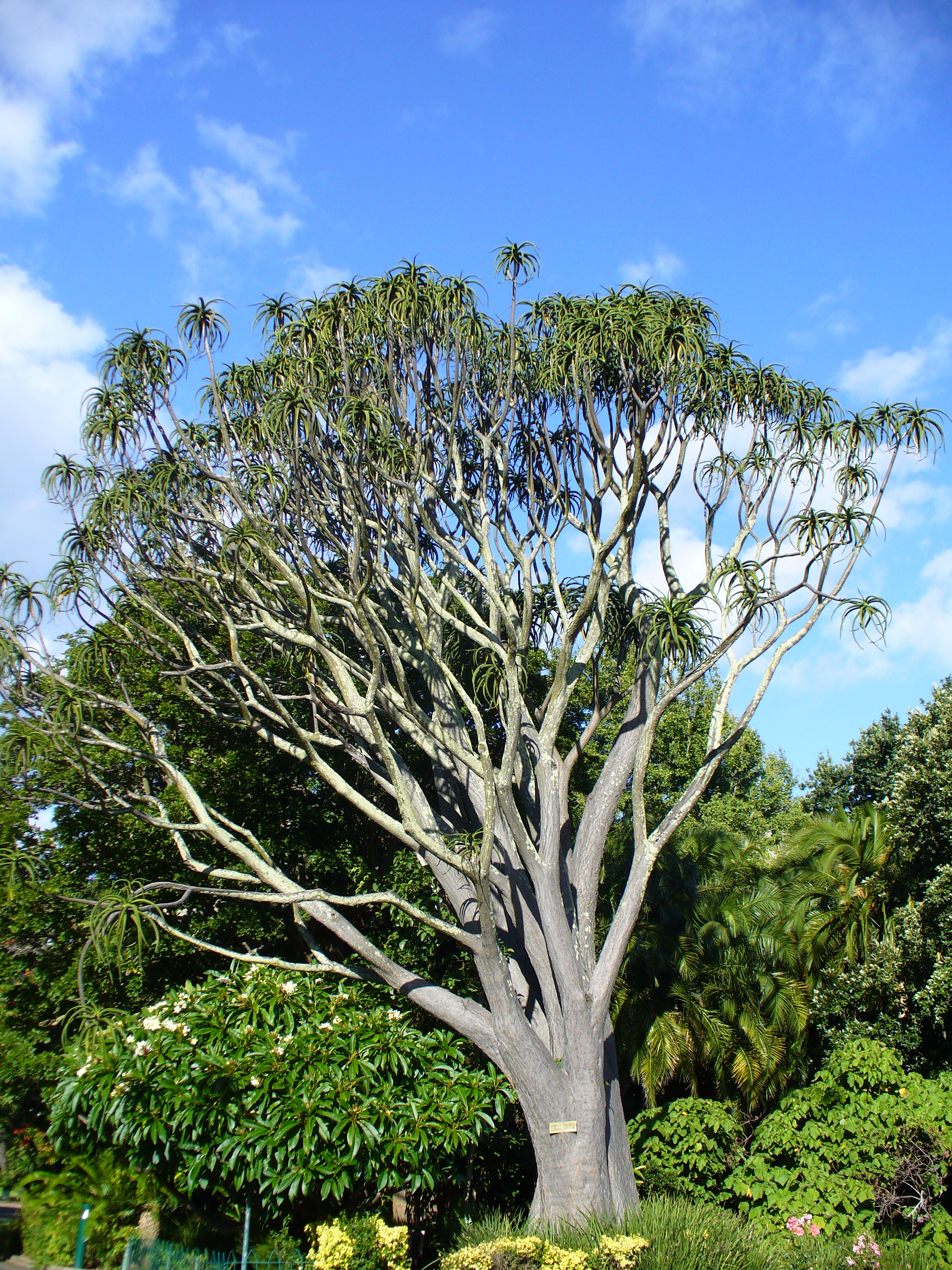
In Cape Town's Company's Garden

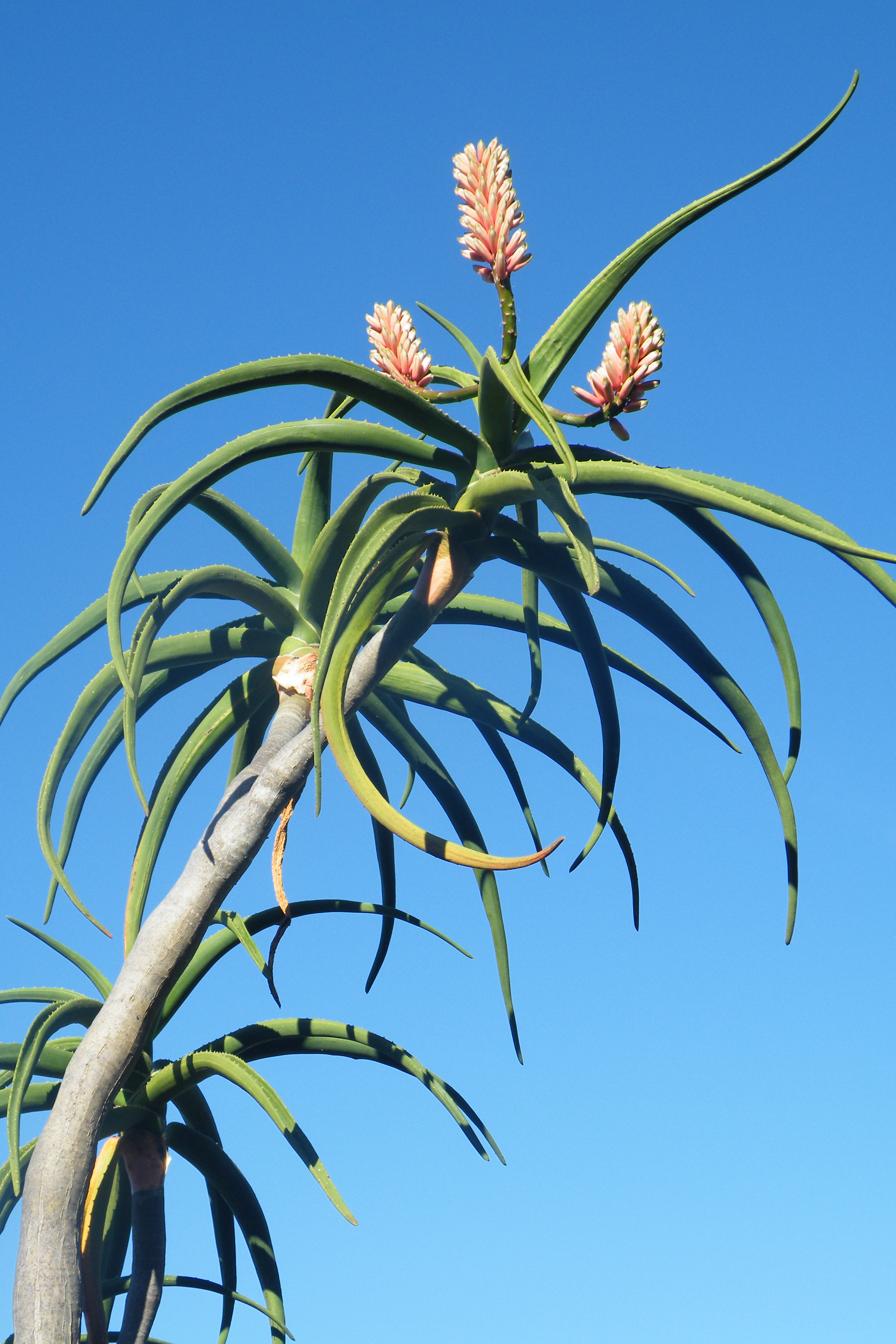
The flowers are pink in small racemes.

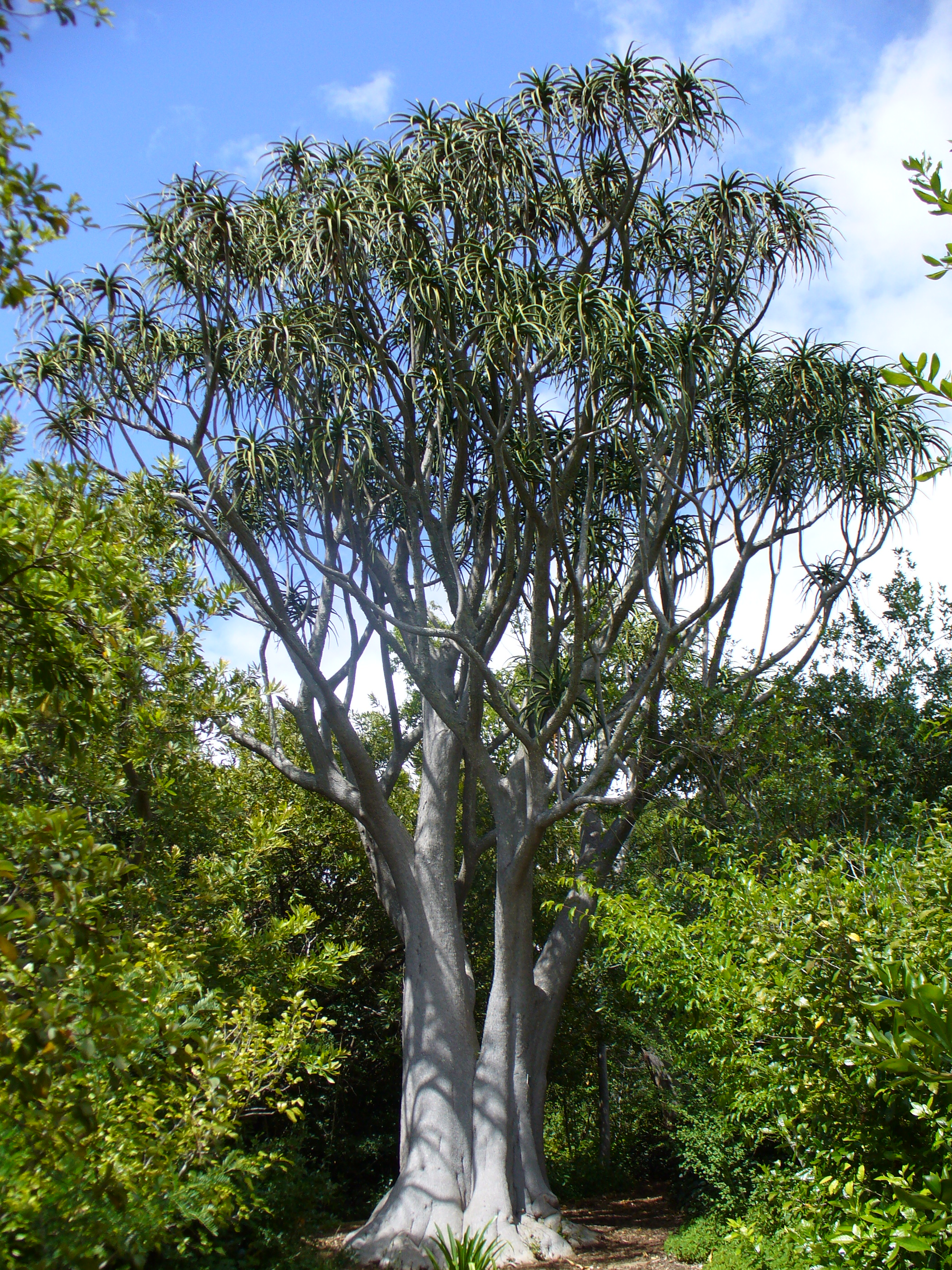
Aloes are not woody trees despite their massive size.

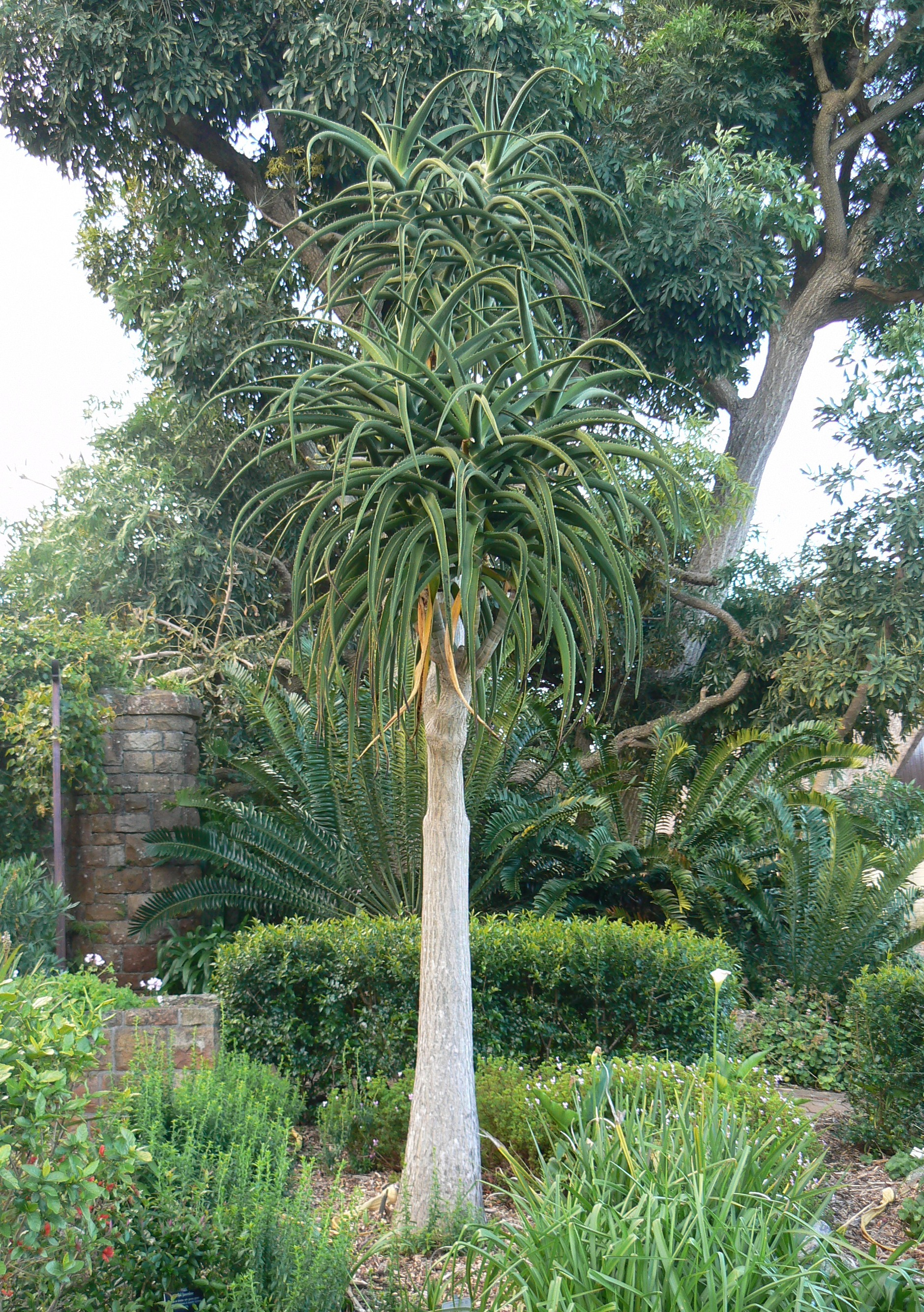
A young Aloe barberae, Kirstenbosch

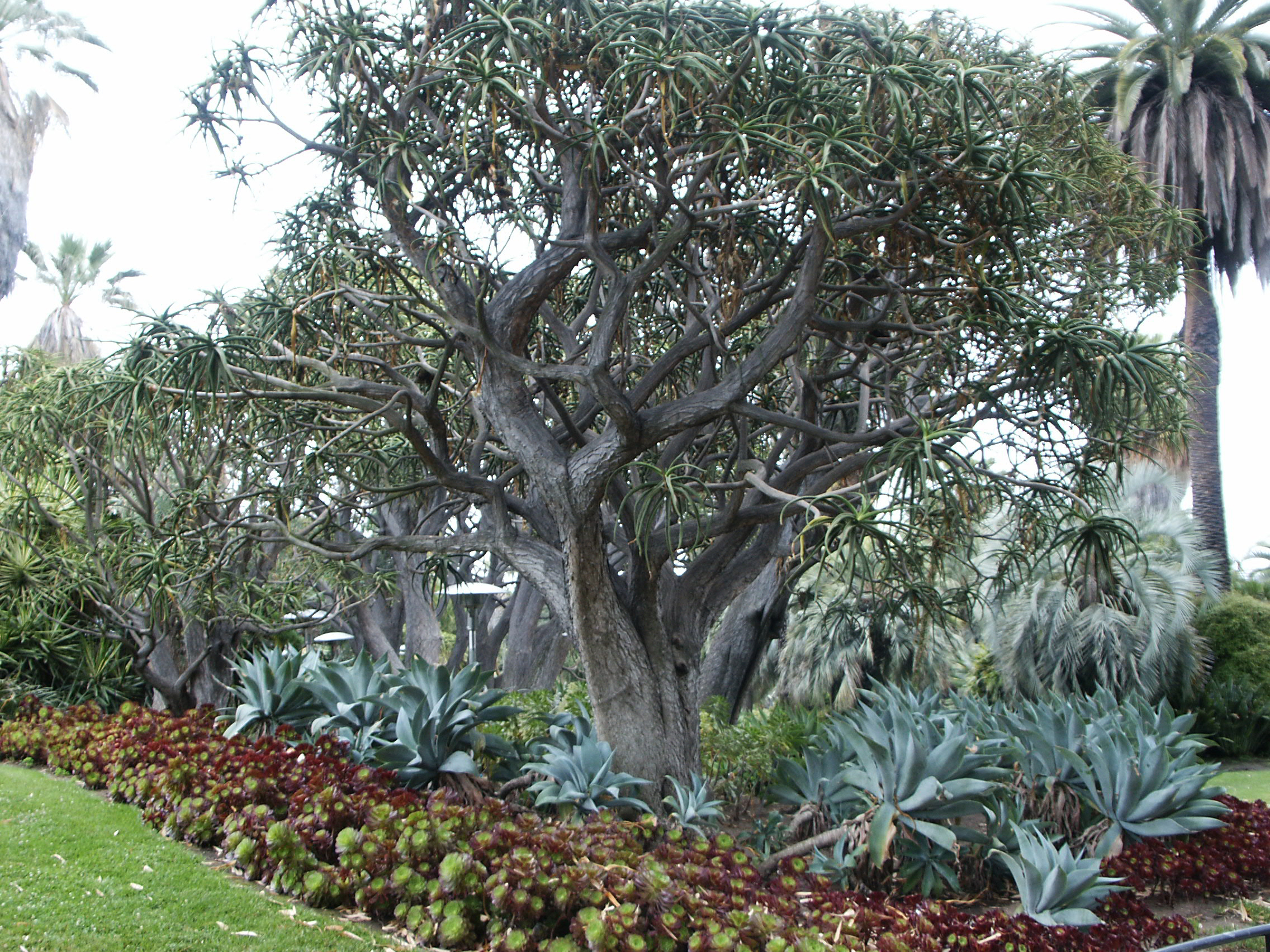
Grove of tree aloes, with blue Agave attenuata, Huntington Desert Garden
