= List of heritage sites in Northern Cape =

This is a list of the heritage sites in as recognized by the South African Heritage Resources Agency. For performance reasons, the following districts have been split off:

- List of heritage sites in Colesberg
- List of heritage sites in Kimberley
- List of heritage sites in Richmond
- List of heritage sites in Victoria West

SAHRA identifier	Site name	Description	Town	District	NHRA status	Coordinates	Image
15/K/Spr/2	Van der Stel's Copper Mine, Carolusberg, Namaqualand District	This piece of land, which is owned by the O'okiep Copper Company Limited, contains a mine shaft sunk by Commander Simon van der Stel on an expedition to the Copper Mountains in 1685. In 1681 a group of Namaquas brought pieces of copper ore to the Cape. Simon van der Stel’s little copper mine is situated high up on the slope of the Copper Mountains, about 11 kilometres east of Springbok, on the road to Aggeneis and Pofadder. Turn-off on R64, just over 7km outside Springbok. Take Carolusberg turn-off and then the site is indicated by signboards from there. Type of site: Mine		Namaqualand	Provincial Heritage Site	29°38′49″S 17°56′44″E	This piece of land, which is owned by the O'okiep Copper Company Limited, contains a mine shaft sunk by Commander Simon van der Stel on an expedition to the Copper Mountains in 1685. In 1681 a group of Namaquas brought pieces of copper ore to the Cape. Simon van der Stel’s little copper mine is situated high up on the slope of the Copper Mountains, about 11 kilometres east of Springbok, on the road to Aggeneis and Pofadder. Turn-off on R64, just over 7km outside Springbok. Take Carolusberg turn-off and then the site is indicated by signboards from there. Type of site: Mine
9/2/008/0004	Old Toll House, Vaal River, Barkly West	The toll house is of stone construction with a corrugated iron roof. The road from Kimberley to Barkly West runs in a north-westerly direction and, just before reaching Barkly West, crosses the Vaal River by this bridge. The toll-house stands on the Barkly West side of the river. The toll house is related to the bridge nearby which was built over the Vaal river as a private undertaking during the last quarter of the 19th century and played an important part in the development of the region beyond the Vaal River. Type of site: Toll. Previous use: Commercial: Toll House. Current use: Disused.	Barkly West	Barkly West	Provincial Heritage Site	28°32′58″S 24°31′59″E	Upload Photo
9/2/008/0005	Old Bridge, Vaal River, Barkly West	The bridge consists of 5 spans of 75 ft and one of 108 ft 6inch.Ironwork weighed 271 tons, was const The Bridge and Toll-House, Barkly West The road from Kimberley to Barkly West runs in a north-westerly direction and, just before reaching Barkly West, crosses the Vaal River by this bridge. The toll-house stands on the Barkly West side of the river. Type of site: Bridge. Previous use: Transportation: Bridge. Current use: Transportation : Bridge.	Barkly West	Barkly West	Provincial Heritage Site	28°33′00″S 24°32′00″E	Upload Photo
9/2/008/0006	St Mary's Church, Church Street, Barkly West	St Mary's Church was the first permanent church building erected in the Klipdrift Area after the discovery of diamonds in this vicinity in 1869. The foundation stone of the building was laid in February 1872 by Sir Henry Barkly. Type of site: Church. Previous use: Religious. Current use: Religious.	Barkly West	Barkly West	Provincial Heritage Site	28°32′10″S 24°31′16″E	Upload Photo
9/2/008/0007	Old Magistrate's Court, Campbell Street, Barkly West	Barkly West Magistrates Court is an excellent example of a late 19th century public building. The building is made of Ventersdorp lava and has a corrugated iron roof with two chimneys. The building was constructed in 1897 by Grant and Dowie contractors as the Magistrates Court for the Barkly West District. Type of site: Courthouse. Previous use: Institutional : Government Office. Current use: Military : Headquarters. in the	Barkly West	Barkly West	Provincial Heritage Site	28°32′18″S 24°31′10″E	Upload Photo
9/2/008/0008	Sydney-on-Vaal, Barkly West District	Sydney-on-Vaal is an excellent example of a village planned in the English tradition of a green or square. The mining village is built around a market square and consists of single storey Victorian buildings. The township was established by the New Vaal River Diamond Exploration Co. in 1902. Type of site: Village. Previous use: Mining. Current use: Mining/Agricultural/Commercial.	Barkly West	Barkly West	Heritage Area	28°26′47″S 24°18′57″E	Upload Photo
9/2/017/0001	Dutch Reformed Church, Voortrekker Street, Brandvlei, Calvinia District	Handsome typical neo-Gothic cruciform church. Well executed detailing externally and internally. The foundation-stone of this neo-Gothic church was laid on 15 July 1905. The building was completed and inaugurated at the end of 1905. Type of site: Church Previous use: Religious. Current use: Church : Dutch Reformed. The foundation-stone of this neo-Gothic church was laid on 15 July 1905. The building was completed and inaugurated at the end of 1905.	Brandvlei	Calvinia	Provincial Heritage Site	30°27′52″S 20°29′08″E	Handsome typical neo-Gothic cruciform church. Well executed detailing externally and internally. The foundation-stone of this neo-Gothic church was laid on 15 July 1905. The building was completed and inaugurated at the end of 1905. Type of site: Church Previous use: Religious. Current use: Church : Dutch Reformed. The foundation-stone of this neo-Gothic church was laid on 15 July 1905. The building was completed and inaugurated at the end of 1905.
9/2/017/0005	Dutch Reformed Church, 15 Dorp Street, Calvinia	It is an imposing Neo-Gothic cruciform church. The foundation stone was laid by on 30 September 1899 and the church was inaugurated in November 190 Type of site: Church Previous use: Religious. Current use: Church : Dutch Reformed. The foundation-stone of this building was laid on 30 September 1899. The church was inaugurated in November 1900. It is an imposing Neo-Gothic cruciform church that was designed by J Gaysford and that constitutes the most important architectural element i	Calvinia	Calvinia	Provincial Heritage Site	31°28′31″S 19°46′22″E	It is an imposing Neo-Gothic cruciform church. The foundation stone was laid by on 30 September 1899 and the church was inaugurated in November 190 Type of site: Church Previous use: Religious. Current use: Church : Dutch Reformed. The foundation-stone of this building was laid on 30 September 1899. The church was inaugurated in November 1900. It is an imposing Neo-Gothic cruciform church that was designed by J Gaysford and that constitutes the most important architectural element i
9/2/017/0006-002	Dutch Reformed Church, Pieter Brundyn Street, Nieuwoudtville	Imposing dressed stone building symmetrically designed in Neo-Gothic style. Greek cross plan with a large high clock tower centrally placed over entrance. Beautifully detailed externally and internally. Type of site: Church Current use: Church : Dutch Reformed.	Nieuwoudtville	Calvinia	Provincial Heritage Site	31°22′32″S 19°06′55″E	Imposing dressed stone building symmetrically designed in Neo-Gothic style. Greek cross plan with a large high clock tower centrally placed over entrance. Beautifully detailed externally and internally. Type of site: Church Current use: Church : Dutch Reformed.
9/2/017/0009	42-44 Hope Street, Calvinia	T-shaped dwelling with adjacent attached building. Type of site: House Current use: Commercial. Originally one of the gabled houses erected near the Dutch Reformed Church. Possibly the first erf in Calvinia to be measured.	Calvinia	Calvinia	Provincial Heritage Site	31°28′31″S 19°46′16″E	T-shaped dwelling with adjacent attached building. Type of site: House Current use: Commercial. Originally one of the gabled houses erected near the Dutch Reformed Church. Possibly the first erf in Calvinia to be measured.
9/2/017/0010	The Dorpshuis, 63 Water Street, Calvinia	Asymmetrical rectangular plan dwelling with two dormer gables. Large pane sash windows. Type of site: House Previous use: Residential. Current use: Guest house. This property includes a very fine mid-19th century dwelling, together with outbuildings	Calvinia	Calvinia	Provincial Heritage Site	31°28′34″S 19°46′09″E	Asymmetrical rectangular plan dwelling with two dormer gables. Large pane sash windows. Type of site: House Previous use: Residential. Current use: Guest house. This property includes a very fine mid-19th century dwelling, together with outbuildings
9/2/019/0002-023	Old Parsonage, Union Square, Carnarvon	Type of site: Parsonage.	Carnarvon	Carnarvon	Provincial Heritage Site	30°58′00″S 22°07′43″E	Type of site: Parsonage.
9/2/019/0002-077	Standard Bank, Alheit Street, Carnarvon	Stone faced/plastered extension/saddle-roof/black cement tiles. Main facade/portico/classic columns/ Type of site: Bank Current use: Commercial: bank. Outstanding Intristic aesthic/architechral merit	Carnarvon	Carnarvon	Register	30°58′01″S 22°07′59″E	Upload Photo
9/2/019/0002-080	10 Daniel Street, Carnarvon	Long and high saddle roofed building with gable end, gables are triangular with shoulders, mock chim Type of site: Masonic Hall Current use: Residential : House. Intrinsic aesthetic/architectural merit	Carnarvon	Carnarvon	Register	30°58′05″S 22°07′46″E	Long and high saddle roofed building with gable end, gables are triangular with shoulders, mock chim Type of site: Masonic Hall Current use: Residential : House. Intrinsic aesthetic/architectural merit
9/2/019/0002-085	Erf 330, Hanau Street, Carnarvon	Stone masonry hall church with a square tower and tiled roof also on tower and dormer vents. Window Corner stone laid by the Administrator Sir Frederic de Waal dated 4-9-1919. The church was possibly Current use: Religious: Church. Intrinsic aesthetic/architectural merit	Carnarvon	Carnarvon	Register	30°58′12″S 22°07′51″E	Upload Photo
9/2/019/0002-086	17 Daniel Street, Carnarvon	2 winged saddle roofed building with Cape Dutch Revival gables and circular vents. Windows are 12x12 Dated 1912 Current use: Religious: Church Office/Parsonage. Intrinsic aesthetic/architectural merit	Carnarvon	Carnarvon	Register	30°58′01″S 22°07′46″E	Upload Photo
9/2/019/0002-087	Erf 328, Hanau Street, Carnarvon	High saddle roofed hall with Cape Dutch Revival concavo convex gable with moulding, plaster pilaster Current use: Civic : Museum. Intrinsic aesthetic/architectural merit	Carnarvon	Carnarvon	Register	30°58′11″S 22°07′46″E	High saddle roofed hall with Cape Dutch Revival concavo convex gable with moulding, plaster pilaster Current use: Civic : Museum. Intrinsic aesthetic/architectural merit
9/2/019/0002-125	22 Grey Street, Carnarvon	3 bay saddle roof house with shouldered triangular end gables with edge mouldings. Wooden verandah w Type of site: House Current use: Residential : House. Intrinsic aesthetic/architectural merit	Carnarvon	Carnarvon	Register	22°07′49″S 30°58′01″E	Upload Photo
9/2/019/0002-128	19 Church Street, Carnarvon	4 bay saddle roofed house with covered gables, finials. Verandah with ogee roof, wooden square suppo Type of site: House Current use: Residential : House. Intrinsic aesthetic/architectural merit	Carnarvon	Carnarvon	Register	30°58′01″S 22°07′43″E	Upload Photo
9/2/019/0002-129	22 Zahn Street, Carnarvon	Long building consisting of Karoo type single storey with a double storey Karoo type extension. Form Type of site: House Current use: Residential : House. Intrinsic aesthetic/architectural merit	Carnarvon	Carnarvon	Register	30°58′05″S 22°07′58″E	Upload Photo
9/2/019/0002-130	11 Sterrenberg Street, Carnarvon	On same erf is an old L-shaped 3 bay house with saddle roof and triangular end gables with shoulder, Type of site: House Current use: Residential : House. Intrinsic aesthetic/architectural merit	Carnarvon	Carnarvon	Register	30°57′59″S 22°07′34″E	Upload Photo
9/2/019/0002-131	7 Sterrenberg Street, Carnarvon	Small 3 bay Karoo cottage with flattish pedimented parapet with plaster mouldings. Plaster surrounds Type of site: House Current use: Residential : House. Intrinsic aesthetic/architectural merit	Carnarvon	Carnarvon	Register	30°58′02″S 22°07′33″E	Upload Photo
9/2/019/0002-134	2 Victoria Street, Carnarvon	3 bay saddle roofed house with covered gables and finials and loft door. Verandah has bullnose roof. Type of site: House Current use: Residential : House. Intrinsic aesthetic/architectural merit	Carnarvon	Carnarvon	Register	30°58′07″S 22°07′39″E	Upload Photo
9/2/019/0002-135	8 Sterrenberg Street, Carnarvon	3 bay Karoo type house with flattish, pedimented parapet with fine plaster edge moulding and cornice Type of site: House Current use: Residential : House. Intrinsic aesthetic/architectural merit	Carnarvon	Carnarvon	Register	30°58′04″S 22°07′34″E	Upload Photo
9/2/019/0002-136	24 Daniel Street, Carnarvon	3 bay Karoo type long house with low pedimented parapet with mouldings, verandah has straight roof w Type of site: House Current use: Residential : House. Intrinsic aesthetic/architectural merit	Carnarvon	Carnarvon	Register	30°57′58″S 22°07′47″E	Upload Photo
9/2/019/0002-137	4 Daniel Street, Carnarvon	3 bay saddle roofed house with triangular shouldered end gables with mock chimneys with mouldings. V Type of site: House Current use: Residential : House. Intrinsic aesthetic/architectural merit	Carnarvon	Carnarvon	Register	30°58′08″S 22°07′45″E	Upload Photo
9/2/019/0002-138	19 Grey Street, Carnarvon	Interesting house. It has 4 bays, steep saddle roof with covered gables, vents and finials. There Type of site: House Current use: Residential : House. Intrinsic aesthetic/architectural merit	Carnarvon	Carnarvon	Register	30°58′01″S 22°07′49″E	Upload Photo
9/2/019/0002-139	17 Grey Street, Carnarvon	2 bay double storey Karoo type house with straight edge moulded parapet. Lower floor has old 6x6 cas Type of site: House Current use: Residential : House. Intrinsic aesthetic/architectural merit	Carnarvon	Carnarvon	Register	30°58′02″S 22°07′49″E	Upload Photo
9/2/019/0002-140	13 Van Riebeeck Street, Carnarvon	Big house with saddle roof and two long wings on sides. Roof has a central dormer loft window with b Type of site: House Current use: Residential : House. Intrinsic aesthetic/architectural merit	Carnarvon	Carnarvon	Register	30°58′10″S 22°08′02″E	Upload Photo
9/2/019/0002-141	9 Kronkel Road, Carnarvon	Small 2 bay Karoo type cottage with flattish pedimented parapet with edge mouldings and cornice. Sim Type of site: House Current use: Residential : House. Intrinsic aesthetic/architectural merit	Carnarvon	Carnarvon	Register	30°58′05″S 22°08′00″E	Upload Photo
9/2/019/0002-142	5 Kronkel Road, Carnarvon	3 bay Karoo type house with interesting stepped and edge-moulded parapet with end plinths. Wooden ve Type of site: House Current use: Residential : House. Intrinsic aesthetic/architectural merit	Carnarvon	Carnarvon	Register	30°58′06″S 22°08′02″E	Upload Photo
9/2/019/0002-143	14 Alheit Street, Carnarvon	Karoo type 3 bay house with flattish pedimented parapet corner plinths and edge mouldings. Front ver Type of site: House Current use: Residential : House. Intrinsic aesthetic/architectural merit	Carnarvon	Carnarvon	Register	30°58′00″S 22°07′50″E	Upload Photo
9/2/019/0002-144	16 Zahn Street, Carnarvon	A long 5-bay Karoo-type house with a flattish pedimented parapet and a verandah with straight roof a Type of site: House Current use: Residential : House. Intrinsic aesthetic/architectural merit	Carnarvon	Carnarvon	Register	30°58′09″S 22°07′58″E	Upload Photo
9/2/019/0002-145	1 End Street, Carnarvon	Short and rather high 3 bay Karoo type house with flat pedimented parapet with corner plinths. Plast Type of site: House Current use: Residential : House. Intrinsic aesthetic/architectural merit	Carnarvon	Carnarvon	Register	30°58′05″S 22°07′30″E	Upload Photo
9/2/019/0002-146	9-11 Grey Street, Carnarvon	Two semi-detached 3-bay and 2-bay Karoo-type houses with a stepped and edge-moulded parapet. The fi Type of site: House Current use: Residential : House. Intrinsic aesthetic/architectural merit	Carnarvon	Carnarvon	Register	30°58′04″S 22°07′49″E	Upload Photo
9/2/019/0002-147	5 End Street, Carnarvon	A long 4-bay Karoo-type house with a low pedimented parapet, heavy edge moulding and low wall round Type of site: House Current use: Residential : House. Environmental interest	Carnarvon	Carnarvon	Register	30°58′05″S 22°07′30″E	Upload Photo
9/2/019/0002-148	10 Church Street, Carnarvon	Long 3 bay Karoo type house with stepped parapet with heavy cornice and verandah with ogee roof and Type of site: House Current use: Residential : House. Intrinsic aesthetic/architectural merit	Carnarvon	Carnarvon	Register	30°58′04″S 22°07′43″E	Upload Photo
9/2/019/0002-149	12 Grey Street, Carnarvon	3 bay house with low pitch saddle roof and fine moulded end gable. Side street has verandah with bul Type of site: House Current use: Residential : House. Intrinsic aesthetic/architectural merit	Carnarvon	Carnarvon	Register	30°58′05″S 22°07′49″E	Upload Photo
9/2/019/0002-150	Johanna Street, Carnarvon	Victorian house with hipped roof and two street wings. Gables have bargeboarding, fine finials and v Type of site: House Current use: Residential : House. Intrinsic aesthetic/architectural merit	Carnarvon	Carnarvon	Register	30°58′09″S 22°07′54″E	Upload Photo
9/2/019/0002-151	14 Johanna Street, Carnarvon	Hipped roof Victorian house with two wings and verandah between them. Gable ends have bargeboarding Type of site: House Current use: Residential : House. Intrinsic aesthetic/architectural merit	Carnarvon	Carnarvon	Register	30°58′05″S 22°07′56″E	Upload Photo
9/2/019/0002-152	9 River Street, Carnarvon	Hipped roof Late Victorian-Edwardian house with two wings and a verandah on each side. Front gable h Type of site: House Current use: Residential : House. Intrinsic aesthetic/architectural merit	Carnarvon	Carnarvon	Register	30°58′05″S 22°07′51″E	Upload Photo
9/2/019/0002-153	5 River Street, Carnarvon	Restored 3 bay saddle roof house with triangular end gables with shoulders. Verandah has concave roo Type of site: House Current use: Residential : House. Intrinsic aesthetic/architectural merit	Carnarvon	Carnarvon	Register	30°58′06″S 22°07′51″E	Upload Photo
9/2/019/0002-154	20 Daniel Street, Carnarvon	High 3 bay saddle roof house with triangular gables with shoulder. Verandah with concave roof on str Type of site: House Current use: Residential : House. Intrinsic aesthetic/architectural merit	Carnarvon	Carnarvon	Register	30°58′00″S 22°07′46″E	Upload Photo
9/2/019/0002-155	6 River Street, Carnarvon	5 bay long saddle roofed house with covered gables, probably originally triangular end gables, finia Type of site: House Previous use: Residential : Single. Current use: Residential : House. Intrinsic aesthetic/architectural merit	Carnarvon	Carnarvon	Register	30°58′06″S 22°07′52″E	Upload Photo
9/2/019/0002-156	7 Johanna Street, Carnarvon	3 bay house with low pitched saddle roof with shouldered triangular end gables. Facade is rusticated Type of site: House Current use: Residential : House. Intrinsic aesthetic/architectural merit	Carnarvon	Carnarvon	Register	30°58′07″S 22°07′55″E	Upload Photo
9/2/019/0002-157	5 Daniel Street, Carnarvon	Big Edwardian house with hipped roof and short wing on each street. Wings have covered gables with b Type of site: House Current use: Residential : House. Intrinsic aesthetic/architectural merit	Carnarvon	Carnarvon	Register	30°58′07″S 22°07′45″E	Upload Photo
9/2/019/0002-158	1 Grey Street, Carnarvon	Late Victorian residence with hipped roof and gablets and finials. Verandah on three sides with bull The author A G Visser is said to have lived here Type of site: House Current use: Residential : House. Intrinsic aesthetic/architectural merit	Carnarvon	Carnarvon	Register	30°58′09″S 22°07′48″E	Upload Photo
9/2/019/0003	Dutch Reformed Mission Church Complex, Union Square, Carnarvon	The complex comprises a vernacular Dutch Reformed Church, an Edwardian parsonage, the original Cape Old Mission School was built in 1864 with an extension of the right c 1902. Old Parsonage is probable Type of site: Church Complex Current use: Religious. The Dutch Reformed Church complex at Carnarvon is an excellent example of a Rhenish Mission built in	Carnarvon	Carnarvon	Provincial Heritage Site	30°57′59″S 22°07′43″E	The complex comprises a vernacular Dutch Reformed Church, an Edwardian parsonage, the original Cape Old Mission School was built in 1864 with an extension of the right c 1902. Old Parsonage is probable Type of site: Church Complex Current use: Religious. The Dutch Reformed Church complex at Carnarvon is an excellent example of a Rhenish Mission built in
9/2/019/0003-001	Dutch Reformed Mission Church, Unieplein, Carnarvon	Type of site: Church Current use: Religious. The Dutch Reformed Church complex at Carnarvon is an excellent example of a Rhenish Mission built in	Carnarvon	Carnarvon	Provincial Heritage Site		Type of site: Church Current use: Religious. The Dutch Reformed Church complex at Carnarvon is an excellent example of a Rhenish Mission built in
9/2/019/0003-002	Dutch Reformed Mission Church Parsonage, Unieplein, Carnarvon	Type of site: Parsonage Current use: Religious. The Dutch Reformed Church complex at Carnarvon is an excellent example of a Rhenish Mission built in	Carnarvon	Carnarvon	Provincial Heritage Site		Upload Photo
9/2/019/0004	Corbelled house complex, Stuurmansfontein, Carnarvon District	Beehive shaped rooms about five metres in diameter and seven metres in height. Originally the floors Far to the north of Beaufort West stretch the hard, parched plains of Williston and Carnarvon. On many farms in that area corbelled houses or so-called klip rondawels may still be seen. These dwellings are interesting examples of the ingenuity of the earli Type of site: Corbelled House Previous use: Residential:Single. Current use: Residential:Dwelling. These peculiar corbelled houses are examples of the ingenuity of the first settlers in this area and are important relics of the cultural and national architectural history in South Africa.	Carnarvon	Carnarvon	Provincial Heritage Site	30°55′00″S 21°39′30″E	Beehive shaped rooms about five metres in diameter and seven metres in height. Originally the floors Far to the north of Beaufort West stretch the hard, parched plains of Williston and Carnarvon. On many farms in that area corbelled houses or so-called klip rondawels may still be seen. These dwellings are interesting examples of the ingenuity of the earli Type of site: Corbelled House Previous use: Residential:Single. Current use: Residential:Dwelling. These peculiar corbelled houses are examples of the ingenuity of the first settlers in this area and are important relics of the cultural and national architectural history in South Africa. Media related to Corbelled house complex, Stuurmansfontein at Wikimedia Commons
9/2/019/0005	Svenskbo, 11 Church Street, Carnarvon	Three bay house with saddle roof. Triangular gables with shoulders, mock chimneys and mouldings. Ver The erf was purchased by E D Afriaanse in 1863, who probably erected the original house. Type of site: House Current use: Residential: House.	Carnarvon	Carnarvon	Provincial Heritage Site	30°58′05″S 22°07′42″E	Three bay house with saddle roof. Triangular gables with shoulders, mock chimneys and mouldings. Ver The erf was purchased by E D Afriaanse in 1863, who probably erected the original house. Type of site: House Current use: Residential: House.
9/2/019/0007	14 New Street, Carnarvon	Flat roofed house with parapet wall and moulded ledge work across the facade. Fenestration is geomet Architectural style: Vernacular. Previous use: Residential. Current use: Residential.	Carnarvon	Carnarvon	Provincial Heritage Site	30°58′03″S 22°07′37″E	Flat roofed house with parapet wall and moulded ledge work across the facade. Fenestration is geomet Architectural style: Vernacular. Previous use: Residential. Current use: Residential.
9/2/019/0009	Corbelled Buildings, T'Kokoboos, Carnarvon District	The complex consists of three corbelled huts which are linked together and a later rectangular build The corbelled buildings in the Karoo were built between 1825 and 1875 when the Trekboeren began to s Type of site: Corbelled House Previous use: Residential:Single. Current use: Residential:Dwelling. T'Kokoboos is one of only two dated corbelled complexes in the Carnarvon District.	Carnarvon	Carnarvon	Provincial Heritage Site	30°55′57″S 21°41′32″E	Upload Photo
9/2/019/0010	Van Wyksvlei Dam, Van Wyksvlei	The length of the dam is 311 metres, height 9.7 metres with a high water mark of 8,2 metres. The wa The dam was built between 1882 and 1885. Surveyor Garwood Alston was responsible for surveying the a Type of site: Dam Previous use: Structural: Dam. Current use: Structural: Dam. It is one of the oldest dams in South Africa with a large water carrying capacity.	Van Wyksvlei	Carnarvon	Provincial Heritage Site	30°23′00″S 21°48′30″E	Upload Photo
9/2/019/0011	Corbelled House Complex, Konka, Carnarvon District	Konka was built in three phases, first the rectangular hut, followed by the circular one, followed b It appears that in the Karoo the first corbelled houses were built during the years 1825 - 1875. Th Type of site: Corbelled house Current use: Unused. Konka is an excellent example of a rare, surviving corbelled house complex and sheep kraal.	Carnarvon	Carnarvon	Provincial Heritage Site	30°54′46″S 21°54′27″E	Konka was built in three phases, first the rectangular hut, followed by the circular one, followed b It appears that in the Karoo the first corbelled houses were built during the years 1825 - 1875. Th Type of site: Corbelled house Current use: Unused. Konka is an excellent example of a rare, surviving corbelled house complex and sheep kraal.
9/2/019/0014	De Bult, Carnarvon	The architecture department of the University of Natal has compiled a survey of De Bul Previous use: Residential. Current use: Residential.	Carnarvon, De Bult	Carnarvon	Heritage Area	30°57′52″S 22°07′32″E	The architecture department of the University of Natal has compiled a survey of De Bul Previous use: Residential. Current use: Residential.
9/2/025/0003	Olive Schreiner House, 9 Grundlingh Street, De Aar	Oostekant 'n tweelinggewel waarvan die agterste as't ware uit die voorste loop. Aan di South Africans have long felt the need for something visible and tangible to preserve the memory of that controversial South African author, Olive Schreiner. Many houses in which she lived for any length of time were visited by the H.M.C. She was restless Type of site: House. In this house the well-known author Olive Schreiner (1855–1920) and her husband S C Cronwright-Schreiner, lived from 1908 to 1913. Here she completed her book "Woman and Labour" and wrote two articles for special occasions entitled "Thoughts About Wome	De Aar	De Aar	Provincial Heritage Site	30°39′25″S 24°00′27″E	Upload Photo
9/2/025/0004	St Paul's Church, Friedlander Street, De Aar	Typically gothic church design with narrow stained glass window slits. It was built as an Anglican Church in 1894. During the Anglo-Boer War it was used by the troops to s Type of site: Church Previous use: Religious : Church. Current use: Religious : Church. The church remains very much in its original condition. It is regarded by the local community.	De Aar	De Aar	Provincial Heritage Site	30°39′07″S 24°00′45″E	Typically gothic church design with narrow stained glass window slits. It was built as an Anglican Church in 1894. During the Anglo-Boer War it was used by the troops to s Type of site: Church Previous use: Religious : Church. Current use: Religious : Church. The church remains very much in its original condition. It is regarded by the local community.
9/2/025/0005	Standard Bank, 10 Alida Street, De Aar	The Bank is a single storey building constructed of brick under a red tiled roof. Designed by William Black and Fagg, the De Aar premises of the Standard Bank were built during 1924- Type of site: Bank Previous use: Commercial:Bank. Current use: Commercial. Built in 1924-1925. It present an imposing and attractive appearance.	De Aar	De Aar	Register	30°39′06″S 24°00′41″E	Upload Photo
9/2/029/0002	Afrikaanse Protestante Kerk, Cilliers Street, Fraserburg	Type of site: Church Previous use: Church : Anglican. Current use: Church : APK.	Fraserburg	Fraserburg	Provincial Heritage Site	31°54′51″S 21°30′35″E	Type of site: Church Previous use: Church : Anglican. Current use: Church : APK.
9/2/029/0005	Peperbus, Market Square, Fraserburg	The so-called "Peperbus" was built in 1861 by Adam Jacobs according to a plan by the Rev. Bamberger. The building is architecturally particularly interesting, with its hexagonal shape which gradually merges into a hexagonal dome and a bell tower. The so-called "Peperbus" was built in 1861 by Adam Jacobs according to a plan by the Rev. Bamberger. The building is architecturally particularly interesting, with its hexagonal shape which gradually merges into a hexagonal dome and a bell tower.	Fraserburg	Fraserburg	Provincial Heritage Site	31°54′48″S 21°30′44″E	The so-called "Peperbus" was built in 1861 by Adam Jacobs according to a plan by the Rev. Bamberger. The building is architecturally particularly interesting, with its hexagonal shape which gradually merges into a hexagonal dome and a bell tower. The so-called "Peperbus" was built in 1861 by Adam Jacobs according to a plan by the Rev. Bamberger. The building is architecturally particularly interesting, with its hexagonal shape which gradually merges into a hexagonal dome and a bell tower.
9/2/029/0006	Old Parsonage Museum, Fraserburg	This house, with its predominantly Cape Dutch characteristics, was designed by the architect H. J. R. Burnett and completed in 1856. Type of site: Parsonage Previous use: Parsonage. Current use: Museum.	Fraserburg	Fraserburg	Provincial Heritage Site	31°54′50″S 21°30′44″E	This house, with its predominantly Cape Dutch characteristics, was designed by the architect H. J. R. Burnett and completed in 1856. Type of site: Parsonage Previous use: Parsonage. Current use: Museum.
9/2/032/0005	North Furrow, Kakamas, Gordonia District	There are two tunnels on the farm which were dug by hand. Dry stone walling was used to stabilise t Work on the North Furrow commenced during April 1899 and by the outbreak of Anglo-Boer War about 2km Type of site: Irrigation Current use: Irrigation. The original furrows, water tunnels and dry stone walling represent a noteworthy early 20th century	Kakamas	Gordonia	Provincial Heritage Site	28°47′08″S 20°38′23″E	Upload Photo
9/2/032/0006	Battlefield, Kakamas, Gordonia District	In 1960 six of the men who had died and buried in the area and whose graves could be traced were re- On 4 February 1915 an attack by German troops on forces of the Union of South Africa took place on this terrain. In 1960 a monument in honour of the German casualties was erected there. A few kilometres from Kakamas a path turns off to the left from the Type of site: Battlefield Previous use: Military : Battlefield. Current use: Unused. A few kilometres from Kakamas a path turns off to the left from the Keimoes road, cross	Kakamas	Gordonia	Provincial Heritage Site	28°44′30″S 20°38′10″E	Upload Photo
9/2/032/0008	Water wheel, near DR Church Parsonage, South Furrow, Kakamas	Wheels of wrought iron with 'bakkies' which take water from South Furrow to a higher position from w This water-wheel, which was erected at the Kakamas Settlement according to the design of Piet Burger, is one of the few remaining examples of its kind. Type of site: Bakkiespomp Current use: Agricultural : Water wheel. This water-wheel, which was erected at the Kakamas Settlement according to the design of Piet Burger, is one of the few remaining examples of its kind.	Kakamas	Gordonia	Provincial Heritage Site	28°46′23″S 20°37′20″E	Upload Photo
9/2/032/0009/001	Water wheel No. 2, Plot 103, South Furrow, Kakamas	Wheels of wrought iron with 'bakkies' which take water from South Furrow to a higher position from w Rev Schroder of the Dutch Reformed Church arranged for the church to assist poor white upliftment by Type of site: Bakkiespomp Current use: Agricultural: Water wheel. The nine water wheels were made by Piet Burger in consultation with a local blacksmith T. Craill c19	Kakamas	Gordonia	Provincial Heritage Site	28°47′00″S 20°38′07″E	Upload Photo
9/2/032/0009/004	Water Wheel No. 1, Plot 103, South Furrow, Kakamas	Type of site: Bakkiespomp Previous use: Waterwheel. Current use: Waterwheel.	Kakamas	Gordonia	Provincial Heritage Site	28°47′01″S 20°38′08″E	Upload Photo
9/2/032/0009/005	Water wheel, Plot 1057, North Furrow, Kakamas	Wheels of wrought iron with 'bakkies' which take water from South Furrow to a higher position from w Rev Schroder of the Dutch Reformed Church arranged for the church to assist poor white upliftment by Type of site: Bakkiespomp Current use: Agricultural: Water wheel. The nine water wheels were made by Piet Burger in consultation with a local blacksmith T. Craill c19	Kakamas	Gordonia	Provincial Heritage Site	28°47′08″S 20°38′24″E	Upload Photo
9/2/032/0009/006	Water wheel, Plot 68, North Furrow, Kakamas	Type of site: Bakkiespomp.	Kakamas	Gordonia	Provincial Heritage Site	28°47′07″S 20°38′18″E	Upload Photo
9/2/032/0009/009	Water Wheel, Plot 1467, South Furrow, Kakamas	Type of site: Bakkiespomp.	Kakamas	Gordonia	Provincial Heritage Site	28°47′02″S 20°38′11″E	Upload Photo
9/2/032/0010	Kakamas Museum, Voortrekker Street, Kakamas	This double storey building consists of a ground floor with a washing area and entrance and there ar Built by A B Hangartner, a Swiss artisan and takes the form of an Egyptian temple. The hydro-electric Type of site: Institutional Previous use: Transformer building. Current use: Museum. The Kakamas Museum building, which in its original form played an important part in the	Kakamas	Gordonia	Provincial Heritage Site	28°46′13″S 20°37′02″E	This double storey building consists of a ground floor with a washing area and entrance and there ar Built by A B Hangartner, a Swiss artisan and takes the form of an Egyptian temple. The hydro-electric Type of site: Institutional Previous use: Transformer building. Current use: Museum. The Kakamas Museum building, which in its original form played an important part in the
9/2/032/0011	Old Dutch Reformed Mission Church, Main Street, Keimoes	The church is a rectangular building and a good example of vernacular church architecture of the lat This Dutch Reformed Mission Church building dates from the year 1889 and was built under the supervision of the Rev. C. H. W. Schroder. The church is a typical example of the vernacular church architecture of the late 19th century. Type of site: Church Previous use: Religious : Church. Current use: Religious: Church.	Keimoes	Gordonia	Provincial Heritage Site	28°42′35″S 20°58′29″E	The church is a rectangular building and a good example of vernacular church architecture of the lat This Dutch Reformed Mission Church building dates from the year 1889 and was built under the supervision of the Rev. C. H. W. Schroder. The church is a typical example of the vernacular church architecture of the late 19th century. Type of site: Church Previous use: Religious : Church. Current use: Religious: Church.
9/2/032/0012	Water Wheel, Main Street, Keimoes	The wrought iron wheel is mounted on the water furrow and shifted by means of reels into the water. Type of site: Bakkiespomp Current use: Agricultural : Water Wheel. This historic water-wheel is one of the few of its kind remaining in South Africa.	Keimoes	Gordonia	Provincial Heritage Site	28°42′35″S 20°58′27″E	The wrought iron wheel is mounted on the water furrow and shifted by means of reels into the water. Type of site: Bakkiespomp Current use: Agricultural : Water Wheel. This historic water-wheel is one of the few of its kind remaining in South Africa.
9/2/032/0013	Dutch Reformed Mission Church, Rietfontein, Gordonia District	Building of rectangular form with saddle roof and decorative end gables. Corner and apex pinnacles. Work began on 13 October and was completed by 15 April 1890. Stone used in the foundations was obtai? Type of site: Church Current use: Religious : Church. The church and bell tower is representative of mission architecture built by the Rhenish Church in G	Rietfontein	Gordonia	Provincial Heritage Site	26°44′45″S 20°01′55″E	Upload Photo
9/2/032/0015	Palm Tree Avenue, The Island, Upington	The 'island' of Upington is part of the municipal area and consists of a large amount of river land This magnificent avenue of full-grown palm trees on the well-known "Eiland" stretches over a distance of 1 041 metres and was planted by the Department of Water Affairs in 1903. It is reputedly the longest palm tree avenue in the Southern Hemisphere. Type of site: Natural Current use: Natural - Palm tree Avenue. This magnificent avenue of full-grown palm trees on the well-known "Eiland" stretches over a distance of 1 041 metres and was planted by the Department of Water Affairs in 1903. It is reputedly the longest palm tree avenue in the Southern Hemisphere.	Upington	Gordonia	Provincial Heritage Site	28°27′48″S 21°14′56″E	Upload Photo
9/2/032/0016	Old Watermill, Upington	Die struktuur bestaann uit 'n dubbelverdiepingebou met 'n boslegrat-tipe hout meulwiel. Die gebou, This watermill was built in 1870 by the missionary C. H. W. Schröder. The structure consists of a double-storeyed building and a wooden mill wheel of the over shot type. Type of site: Water Mill. This watermill was built in 1870 by the missionary C. H. W. Schröder. The structure consists of a double-storeyed building and a wooden mill wheel of the over shot type.	Upington	Gordonia	Provincial Heritage Site	28°27′45″S 21°14′26″E	Die struktuur bestaann uit 'n dubbelverdiepingebou met 'n boslegrat-tipe hout meulwiel. Die gebou, This watermill was built in 1870 by the missionary C. H. W. Schröder. The structure consists of a double-storeyed building and a wooden mill wheel of the over shot type. Type of site: Water Mill. This watermill was built in 1870 by the missionary C. H. W. Schröder. The structure consists of a double-storeyed building and a wooden mill wheel of the over shot type.
9/2/032/0017	Cathedral of St Augustine, Le Roux Street, Upington	The building is in a neo-gothic style with a towering bell tower on the side. This neo-Gothic church with its impressive bell-tower was erected during the years 1942 to 1949 by the Rev. Karl Simbruner and Brother Hugo with the help of schoolchildren and the inhabitants of Upington. Type of site: Cathedral Current use: Religious : Cathedral. Upington developed from a mission station on the farm Olyvenhoutsdrift, founded in 1871	Upington	Gordonia	Provincial Heritage Site	28°27′17″S 21°14′47″E	Upload Photo
9/2/032/0018	Museum Complex, Schroder Street, Upington	Complex consists of a parsonage and church building. The parsonage is of rectangular form with a st The old Nederduitse Gereformeerde Mission Station, which was known as Olyvenhoutsdrift, was founded here m 1873 by the Rev. Christiaan Schroder. The mission church and the old Schröder parsonage date from 1875 and 1883 respectively. This complex has been Type of site: Civic Previous use: Mission Station. Current use: Museum. The old Dutch Reformed Mission Station, which was known as Olyvenhoutsdrift, was founded in 1873 by the Rev. Christiaan Schröder. The mission church and the old Schröder parsonage date from 1875 and 1883 respectively. This complex is now a museum.	Upington	Gordonia	Provincial Heritage Site	28°27′42″S 21°14′37″E	Complex consists of a parsonage and church building. The parsonage is of rectangular form with a st The old Nederduitse Gereformeerde Mission Station, which was known as Olyvenhoutsdrift, was founded here m 1873 by the Rev. Christiaan Schroder. The mission church and the old Schröder parsonage date from 1875 and 1883 respectively. This complex has been Type of site: Civic Previous use: Mission Station. Current use: Museum. The old Dutch Reformed Mission Station, which was known as Olyvenhoutsdrift, was founded in 1873 by the Rev. Christiaan Schröder. The mission church and the old Schröder parsonage date from 1875 and 1883 respectively. This complex is now a museum. Media related to Kalahari-Oranje Museum at Wikimedia Commons
9/2/032/0019	Dutch Reformed Church, Schroder Street, Upington	This neo-Gothic church, designed by the firm of architects F. W. and F. Hesse of Cape Town, was erected in 1911 and officially inaugurated on 13 April 1912. Type of site: Church. This neo-Gothic church, designed by the firm of architects F W and F Hesse of Cape Town, was erected in 1911 and officially inaugurated on 13 April 1912.	Upington	Gordonia	Provincial Heritage Site	28°27′15″S 21°15′01″E	This neo-Gothic church, designed by the firm of architects F. W. and F. Hesse of Cape Town, was erected in 1911 and officially inaugurated on 13 April 1912. Type of site: Church. This neo-Gothic church, designed by the firm of architects F W and F Hesse of Cape Town, was erected in 1911 and officially inaugurated on 13 April 1912. Media related to Dutch Reformed Church, Upington at Wikimedia Commons
9/2/035/0002-014	Bell Street, Hanover	Interesting vernacular building with saddle roof and lean-to additions. Buttresses support lean-to Type of site: House Current use: Vacant. Intrinsic aesthetic/architectural merit.	Hanover	Hanover	Register	31°04′13″S 24°26′35″E	Upload Photo
9/2/035/0002-035	Erf 215, Market Street, Hanover	Single storey rectangular form Karoo building with wrap-around verandah supported by brick pillars a Type of site: House Current use: Residential: House. Intrinsic aesthetic/architectural merit.	Hanover	Hanover	Register	31°04′05″S 24°26′33″E	Upload Photo
9/2/035/0003	Magistrates Court, Magistrates Office and Post Office, 1-5 Church Street, Hanover	Court House: A double void oblong building with no features except windows in upper voi Type of site: Courthouse and Post Office. These three buildings form an interesting historic group on the corner of Church Street, Hanover	Hanover	Hanover	Register	31°04′00″S 24°26′43″E	Court House: A double void oblong building with no features except windows in upper voi Type of site: Courthouse and Post Office. These three buildings form an interesting historic group on the corner of Church Street, Hanover
9/2/035/0003-001	Magistrate's Court, Church Street, Hanover	Corner building. Part of Post Office complex. Simple square form building with decorative pediment Type of site: Courthouse Current use: Institutional : Court. Intrinsic aesthetic/architectural merit	Hanover	Hanover	Register	31°04′00″S 24°26′43″E	Corner building. Part of Post Office complex. Simple square form building with decorative pediment Type of site: Courthouse Current use: Institutional : Court. Intrinsic aesthetic/architectural merit
9/2/035/0003-002	Post Office, Church Street, Hanover	Post Office: Single storey, rectangular form building with complex roof and gablet. Ogee verandah Type of site: Post Office Current use: Institutional : Post Office. Intrinsic aesthetic/architectural merit	Hanover	Hanover	Register	31°04′00″S 24°26′43″E	Upload Photo
9/2/035/0004	Police Station and Gaol, 13 Church Street, Hanover	Interesting stone buildings, the gaol has a flat roof, the police station - a saddle roof. Parapet a Type of site: Police Station, Gaol Current use: Civic: Police station and Gaol. Intrinsic aesthetic/architectural merit	Hanover	Hanover	Register	31°04′00″S 24°26′43″E	Upload Photo
9/2/035/0005	C J V Hall, Market Street, Hanover	Single storey rectangular form hall building with saddle roof and decorative front end gables. Pill Type of site: Hall Current use: Religious : Church hall. Outstanding aesthetic/architectural merit.	Hanover	Hanover	Register	31°04′05″S 24°26′33″E	Upload Photo
9/2/035/0006	Camdeboo House, 3 Viljoen Street, Hanover	Building is lined asymmetrical with the road. The oldest building in Hanover. Probably the original Type of site: House Previous use: Residential : Single. Current use: Civic: Museum.	Hanover	Hanover	Provincial Heritage Site	31°04′00″S 24°26′26″E	Upload Photo
9/2/035/0009	Olive Schreiner House, 11 Grace Street, Hanover	Karoo building of rectangular form. Single storey with hipped corrugated iron roof. Original Frenc Occupied by Olive Schreiner between 1900 and 1907 Type of site: House Current use: Residential: House. Outstanding aesthetic/architectural merit	Hanover	Hanover	Register	31°03′55″S 24°26′38″E	Upload Photo
9/2/035/0010	Dutch Reformed Church, Church Street, Hanover	Gothic style cathedral type church building of crucifix form with fine decorative turret. Intact in Type of site: Church Current use: Religious : Church. Outstanding aesthetic/architectural merit	Hanover	Hanover	Provincial Heritage Site	31°03′59″S 24°26′29″E	Gothic style cathedral type church building of crucifix form with fine decorative turret. Intact in Type of site: Church Current use: Religious : Church. Outstanding aesthetic/architectural merit
9/2/035/0011	Erven 92 and 93, cnr Christoffel and Darling Streets, Hanover	Good example of Cape Dutch architecture. Possibly the northernmost boundary of this architecture Erven 92 and 93 were first surveyed on 18 January 1859, shortly after the founding of the town of Hanover Type of site: House Current use: Residential: House. The Cape Dutch house in Christoffel Street, is one of only two known remaining structures of its type	Hanover	Hanover	Provincial Heritage Site	31°03′56″S 24°26′34″E	Good example of Cape Dutch architecture. Possibly the northernmost boundary of this architecture Erven 92 and 93 were first surveyed on 18 January 1859, shortly after the founding of the town of Hanover Type of site: House Current use: Residential: House. The Cape Dutch house in Christoffel Street, is one of only two known remaining structures of its type
9/2/035/0012-001	Irrigation furrow and trees on eastern side of town, Hanover	Open space with numerous gum trees. Irrigation canal. Type of site: Tree, Furrow Current use: Open Space. Aesthetically pleasing precinct which gives character to Christoffel Street.	Hanover	Hanover	Register	31°04′06″S 24°26′23″E	Upload Photo
9/2/035/0012-002	Market Square, Corner of Loop, Darling and Market Streets, Hanover	Open space surrounded by cypress trees and lawned. Type of site: Civic Current use: Recreational. Intrinsic aesthetic/architectural merit.	Hanover	Hanover	Register	31°04′09″S 24°26′32″E	Upload Photo
9/2/035/0012-003	Erf 389, Murray Street, Hanover	Narrow rectangular house with corrugated iron saddle roof and loft doors. Original openings evident Type of site: House Current use: Residential: House. Intrinsic aesthetic/architectural merit.	Hanover	Hanover	Register	31°04′05″S 24°26′23″E	Upload Photo
9/2/035/0012-004	Cnr Boom and Market Streets, Hanover	Single storey square form building with saddle roof and wrap-around bullnose verandah supported by G Type of site: House Current use: Residential: House. Intrinsic aesthetic/architectural merit.	Hanover	Hanover	Register	31°04′05″S 24°26′31″E	Upload Photo
9/2/035/0012-011	7 Church Street, Hanover	Karoo style building with hipped roof. Original 12X12 sliding sash windows with shutters and centra Type of site: House Current use: Residential: House. . Intrinsic aesthetic/architectural merit	Hanover	Hanover	Register	31°04′00″S 24°26′43″E	Upload Photo
9/2/035/0012-012	Dutch Reformed Church Office, cnr Ryneveldt and Murray Street, Hanover	Corner house of square form with hipped roof and wrap-around verandah on precast columns. Detailing Type of site: Church Office Current use: Religious: Church Office. Intrinsic aesthetic/architectural merit.	Hanover	Hanover	Register	31°04′02″S 24°26′29″E	Upload Photo
9/2/035/0012-013	Erf 321, Cnr Gouws and Duncan Streets, Hanover	Single storeyed house with saddle roof and ogee verandah supported by concrete columns. Original wi Type of site: House Current use: Residential: House. Intrinsic aesthetic/architectural merit.	Hanover	Hanover	Register	31°04′10″S 24°26′28″E	Upload Photo
9/2/035/0012-015	Hanover Primary School, Rawstornes Street, Hanover	Two forward projecting bays to main school building. High decorative wall between two bays. Recess Type of site: School Current use: Educational : School. Intrinsic aesthetic/architectural merit.	Hanover	Hanover	Register	31°04′05″S 24°26′23″E	Upload Photo
9/2/035/0012-020	Standard Bank, cnr Market and Darling Streets, Hanover	Bakeresque style building with two Doric columns at front entrance. Square form with saddle roof. T Type of site: Bank Current use: Commercial : Bank. Intrinsic aesthetic/architectural merit.	Hanover	Hanover	Register	31°04′05″S 24°26′33″E	Upload Photo
9/2/035/0012-021	Shop, cnr Darling and Loop Streets, Hanover	Vacant shop. Single storey with corrugated iron saddle roof and forward projecting gablet with dorm Type of site: Commercial Current use: Vacant. Intrinsic aesthetic/architectural merit.	Hanover	Hanover	Register	31°04′08″S 24°26′32″E	Upload Photo
9/2/035/0012-022	Shop complex, Market Street, Hanover	Single storey rectangular form shop complex with some original sliding sash windows and doors. Comp Type of site: Commercial Current use: Unoccupied. Intrinsic aesthetic/architectural merit.	Hanover	Hanover	Register	31°04′05″S 24°26′33″E	Upload Photo
9/2/035/0012-023	Hall, cnr Market and Darling Streets, Hanover	Single storey hall building of rectangular form with Cape revival gable with forward projecting port Type of site: Civic Current use: Community Hall. Intrinsic aesthetic/architectural merit.	Hanover	Hanover	Register	31°04′05″S 24°26′33″E	Upload Photo
9/2/035/0012-024	Library, Darling Street, Hanover	Single storey hall building of rectangular form with Cape revival gable on facade facing Darling Str Type of site: Library Current use: Civic: Library. Intrinsic aesthetic/architectural merit.	Hanover	Hanover	Register	31°04′02″S 24°26′33″E	Upload Photo
9/2/035/0012-025	Outbuilding, Boom Street, Hanover	Outbuilding, probably stables. Vernacular style with central loft door on front facade, facing Boom Type of site: Outbuilding Current use: Vacant. Intrinsic aesthetic/architectural merit.	Hanover	Hanover	Register	31°04′06″S 24°26′23″E	Upload Photo
9/2/035/0012-029	Cnr Darling and Berg Streets, Hanover	Single storey Victorian house with corrugated iron saddle roof and two forward projecting bays on ei Type of site: House Current use: Residential: House. Intrinsic aesthetic/architectural merit.	Hanover	Hanover	Register	31°04′14″S 24°26′35″E	Upload Photo
9/2/035/0012-030	Cnr Market and Rawstorne Streets, Hanover	Square form single storey Karoo building with hipped roof. Ogee verandah supported by columns (inco Type of site: House Current use: Residential: House. Intrinsic aesthetic/architectural merit.	Hanover	Hanover	Register	31°04′03″S 24°26′23″E	Upload Photo
9/2/035/0012-031	Gouws Street, Hanover	Victorian single storey house with two forward projecting bays and central ogee verandah in between Type of site: House Current use: Residential: House. Intrinsic aesthetic/architectural merit.	Hanover	Hanover	Register	31°04′13″S 24°26′26″E	Upload Photo
9/2/035/0012-032	Cnr Viljoen and Ryneveldt Streets, Hanover	Original Cape building with concave/convex gable and loft door. O-shaped form and wrap-around stoep Type of site: House Current use: Vacant. Intrinsic aesthetic/architectural merit.	Hanover	Hanover	Register	31°04′02″S 24°26′28″E	Upload Photo
9/2/035/0012-033	Erf 224, Murray Street, Hanover	Single storey, Karoo style building with hipped corrugated iron roof. Castellated pediment. Symmetr Type of site: House Current use: Residential: House. Intrinsic aesthetic/architectural merit.	Hanover	Hanover	Register	31°04′06″S 24°26′23″E	Upload Photo
9/2/035/0012-034	Cnr Rhyneveldt and Boom Streets, Hanover	Narrow rectangular cottage with saddle roof and end gables. Front verandah supported by wooden colu Type of site: House Current use: Vacant. Intrinsic aesthetic/architectural merit.	Hanover	Hanover	Register	31°04′02″S 24°26′30″E	Upload Photo
9/2/035/0012-036	Erf 393, Cnr Gouws and Duncan Streets, Hanover	Single storeyed house with saddle roof and ogee verandah supported by pre-cast columns. Original wi Type of site: House Current use: Residential: House. Intrinsic aesthetic/architectural merit.	Hanover	Hanover	Register	31°04′10″S 24°26′26″E	Upload Photo
9/2/035/0012-038	Cnr Duncan and Darling Streets, Hanover	Single storey rectangular form house with hipped roof. Double doors on both elevations. 2X2 slidin Type of site: House Current use: Residential: House. Outstanding aesthetic/architectural merit.	Hanover	Hanover	Register	31°04′10″S 24°26′32″E	Upload Photo
9/2/035/0012-041	Cnr Burger and New Streets, Hanover	Single storey Karoo house of square form with flat roof. Decorative cornice on front facade and quo Type of site: House Current use: Residential: House. Intrinsic aesthetic/architectural merit	Hanover	Hanover	Register	31°03′53″S 24°26′35″E	Upload Photo
9/2/035/0012-042	Erf 218, Boom Street, Hanover	Single storey cottage of rectangular form with original fenestration. Verandah supported by wooden Type of site: House Current use: Residential: House. Intrinsic aesthetic/architectural merit.	Hanover	Hanover	Register	31°04′06″S 24°26′23″E	Upload Photo
9/2/035/0012-043	Cnr Loop and Gouws Streets, Hanover	Single storey house of square form with saddle roof and thatched roof addition on Loop Street fasade Type of site: House Current use: Residential: House. Intrinsic aesthetic/architectural merit.	Hanover	Hanover	Register	31°04′08″S 24°26′26″E	Upload Photo
9/2/035/0012-044	Cnr Bell and Berg Streets, Hanover	Single storey house of square form with low saddle roof and wrap-around verandah supported by brick Type of site: House Current use: Residential: House. The building contributes the environment and although not of great intrinsic merit is intact.	Hanover	Hanover	Register	31°04′13″S 24°26′35″E	Upload Photo
9/2/035/0012-045	Erf 511, Darling Street, Hanover	Single storey Victorian building of rectangular form with saddle roof, two chimneys. Corrugated iro Type of site: House Current use: Residential: House. Intrinsic aesthetic/architectural merit.	Hanover	Hanover	Register	31°04′01″S 24°26′33″E	Upload Photo
9/2/035/0012-046	Cnr Murray and Market Streets, Hanover	Victorian L-shaped single storey building with two bays - one facing Market and the other Murray Str Type of site: House Current use: Residential: House. Intrinsic aesthetic/architectural merit.	Hanover	Hanover	Register	31°04′06″S 24°26′23″E	Upload Photo
9/2/035/0012-047	Rhyneveldt Street, Hanover	Karoo house with symmetrical replaced sliding sash windows and shutters. Original door replaced wit Type of site: House Current use: Residential: House. Intrinsic aesthetic/architectural merit	Hanover	Hanover	Register	31°04′02″S 24°26′29″E	Upload Photo
9/2/035/0012-048	Grace Street, Hanover	Single storey Karoo building of square form with hipped roof. Original fenestration - sliding sash Type of site: House Current use: Residential: House. Intrinsic aesthetic/architectural merit	Hanover	Hanover	Register	31°03′55″S 24°26′35″E	Upload Photo
9/2/037/0003	Mary Moffat Museum, Main Street, Griquatown	Single storey building of rectangular form. Built of banded ironstone with thatched hipped roof. S It was here that Mary Moffat, daughter of the missionary Robert Moffat was born. It is the same buil Type of site: House Previous use: Residential : Single - Commercial : Bank. Current use: Museum. The building was built in the first half of the 19th century when Griquatown was the main cent	Griquatown	Hay	Provincial Heritage Site	28°50′53″S 23°15′06″E	Single storey building of rectangular form. Built of banded ironstone with thatched hipped roof. S It was here that Mary Moffat, daughter of the missionary Robert Moffat was born. It is the same buil Type of site: House Previous use: Residential : Single - Commercial : Bank. Current use: Museum. The building was built in the first half of the 19th century when Griquatown was the main cent
9/2/037/0004	Moffat's Pulpit, Mary Moffat Museum, Main Street, Griquatown	The pulpit made of packing cases and local timber and said to be the handiwork of the pioneer missio Griquatown, the former capital of the Griquas, lies 40 km west of Campbell. It is an old village, full of associations should go to Kuruman as a missionary to the Tswana. On his way to Kuruman in 1820 he stopped in Griquatown for several months to assist Type of site: Pulpit Previous use: Pulpit. Current use: Museum exhibit. Griquatown, the former capital of the Griquas, lies 40 km west of Campbell. It is an o	Griquatown	Hay	Heritage Object		Upload Photo
9/2/037/0005	Old Residency, Main Street, Griquatown	Building of square plan built of dolomite with a corrugated iron roof. The front and side elevation Type of site: Residency Previous use: Residential : Single. Current use: Military : Headquarters.	Griquatown	Hay	Provincial Heritage Site	28°50′54″S 23°15′04″E	Building of square plan built of dolomite with a corrugated iron roof. The front and side elevation Type of site: Residency Previous use: Residential : Single. Current use: Military : Headquarters.
9/2/037/0006	Post Office and Magistrate's Court, Main Street, Griquatown	The building is single storeyed and constructed of dressed dolomite. It has a hipped roof and two s Type of site: Courthouse and Post Office Current use: Civic:Magistrates Court and Post Office. This is the seat of the Magistrate and other civic offices in the district of Hay. Constructed c 188	Griquatown	Hay	Register	28°50′53″S 23°15′06″E	Upload Photo
9/2/038/0004	Mission Church, Campbell, Herbert District	The heavy ironstone foundations were laid on limestone. The walls are partially built of dolerite. O The church was opened on the first Sunday of January 1831. It had taken 4 years to build the church. Bartlett died in 1849 and Cornelis Kok kept up the services by using Griqua lay readers. In 1889 the??? This site was one of the earliest centres of Chr Type of site: Church Previous use: Religious : Church. Current use: Religious : Church. The main road from Kimberley to the west crosses the Vaal at Schmidtsdrift. Forty kilo	Campbell	Herbert	Provincial Heritage Site	28°48′11″S 23°43′12″E	The heavy ironstone foundations were laid on limestone. The walls are partially built of dolerite. O The church was opened on the first Sunday of January 1831. It had taken 4 years to build the church. Bartlett died in 1849 and Cornelis Kok kept up the services by using Griqua lay readers. In 1889 the??? This site was one of the earliest centres of Chr Type of site: Church Previous use: Religious : Church. Current use: Religious : Church. The main road from Kimberley to the west crosses the Vaal at Schmidtsdrift. Forty kilo
9/2/038/0005	Warren's Survey Beacons, Ramah, Herbert District	These three beacons form part of the boundary line between the Orange Free State and Griqualand West which Sir Charles Warren and Jos. E. de Villiers established in 1876 and 1877. This marked the end of the so-called Diamond Fields Dispute. Type of site: Beacon. These three beacons form part of the boundary line between the Free State and Griqualand West which Sir Charles Warren and Jos. E de Villiers established in 1876 and 1877. This marked the end of the so-called Diamond Fields Dispute.		Herbert	Provincial Heritage Site	29°36′22″S 24°22′27″E	Upload Photo
9/2/038/0006	Anglo-Boer War Blockhouse, Modder River, Herbert District	Blockhouse is of stone construction. Originally it had three defensive levels from ground to third s The blockhouse was incorporated in Lord Kitchener's blockhouse scheme stretching from Orange River S Type of site: Blockhouse Previous use: Military : ABW Blockhouse. Current use: Military :Blockhouse. The blockhouse was erected in 1901 during the Anglo- Boer War by the Royal Engineers to secure the r	Modder River	Herbert	Provincial Heritage Site	29°02′21″S 24°37′33″E	Upload Photo
9/2/038/0014	Glacial pavement, Bucklands, Herbert District	The Griqualand West Dwyka Series comprises two geological features associated with ice The glacial pavements at Bucklands and Blaauwboschdrift, like those at Nooitgedacht in Type of site: Glacial pavement. The glacial pavements at Bucklands and Blaauwboschdrift are extensive ssmooth rock surfa		Herbert	Provincial Heritage Site	29°08′49″S 23°41′55″E	Upload Photo
9/2/038/0015	Glacial pavement, Blaauboschdrift, Herbert District	The Griqualand West Dwyka Series comprises two geological features associated with ice The glacial pavements at Bucklands and Blaauwboschdrift, like those at Nooitgedacht in Type of site: Glacial pavement. The glacial pavements at Bucklands and Blaauwboschdrift are extensive ssmooth rock surfa		Herbert	Provincial Heritage Site	29°03′06″S 23°42′12″E	Upload Photo
9/2/043/0004	Ruins of Jacobs house, De Kalk, Hopetown District	The house was already direlect in 1880. All that remains is the stone base of the walls on three si In this vicinity Schalk van Niekerk in 1867 noticed the "pretty stone" found by the young Erasmus Jacobs and used by the children as a plaything. It proved to be the first authenticated diamond to be found in South Africa. Known later as the "Eureka", it Type of site: Ruin Previous use: Dwelling. Current use: Ruin. Although the ordinance issued by Governor Sir John Cradock in 1812 to regulate the esta	Hopetown	Hopetown	Provincial Heritage Site	29°16′50″S 23°46′20″E	Upload Photo
9/2/043/0006	Old wagon bridge, Orange River, Hopetown District	The bridge is of stone construction. Tall supporting cement pillars cross the Orange River. Wrought The bridge was ordered from Westwood Baillie and Co Scotland. It was shipped to Cape Town, railed t Type of site: Bridge Current use: Transportation : Bridge. The bridge was built to link the Kimberley diamond mines with the Cape. During the Anglo-Boer War th	Hopetown	Hopetown	Provincial Heritage Site	29°34′10″S 24°04′20″E	The bridge is of stone construction. Tall supporting cement pillars cross the Orange River. Wrought The bridge was ordered from Westwood Baillie and Co Scotland. It was shipped to Cape Town, railed t Type of site: Bridge Current use: Transportation : Bridge. The bridge was built to link the Kimberley diamond mines with the Cape. During the Anglo-Boer War th
9/2/043/0010	Reformed Church (Kruiskerk), Liebenberg Street, Strydenburg	The church is a simple T-shaped stone building with a symmetrical facade and roof of sink. The church In 1914 the various congregations of the 'Kerk onder die Kruis' amalgamated and joined t Type of site: Church Previous use: Religious : Church. Current use: Religious : Church. In 1897 a number of members of the NG Church broke away to form their own congregation. The land was	Strydenburg	Hopetown	Provincial Heritage Site	29°56′33″S 23°40′33″E	The church is a simple T-shaped stone building with a symmetrical facade and roof of sink. The church In 1914 the various congregations of the 'Kerk onder die Kruis' amalgamated and joined t Type of site: Church Previous use: Religious : Church. Current use: Religious : Church. In 1897 a number of members of the NG Church broke away to form their own congregation. The land was
9/2/043/0011	67 Van Wyk Street, Strydenburg	It has corrugated iron roof which slopes towards the rear of the house. The front and side walls all Type of site: Building Previous use: Residential : Single. Current use: Disused. The erf upon which the house stands was purchased by Hendrick Johannes Liebenberg on 13 May 1893 fro	Strydenburg	Hopetown	Provincial Heritage Site	29°56′32″S 23°40′33″E	Upload Photo
9/2/048/0004	Dumortierite Occurrence, N'Rougas North, Kenhardt District	Dumortierite is an unusual and rare aluminium silicate mineral with a distinctive blue to blue-green		Kenhardt	Provincial Heritage Site	29°04′37″S 21°05′14″E	Upload Photo
9/2/048/0005	Old Library Building, Park Street, Kenhardt	The building with its corrugated iron roof and verandah is a typical example of a pioneers house. This building, which was erected in 1897, is a typical example of a pioneer house. It is one of the oldest buildings in Kenhardt and is of great historical importance to the area. The building was used as a library until 1977 and is one of the most Type of site: Library Previous use: Residential : Single. Current use: Institutional - Museum. This building, which was erected in 1897, is a typical example of a pioneer house. It is one of the oldest buildings in Kenhardt and is of great historical importance to the area.	Kenhardt	Kenhardt	Provincial Heritage Site	29°20′55″S 21°09′09″E	The building with its corrugated iron roof and verandah is a typical example of a pioneers house. This building, which was erected in 1897, is a typical example of a pioneer house. It is one of the oldest buildings in Kenhardt and is of great historical importance to the area. The building was used as a library until 1977 and is one of the most Type of site: Library Previous use: Residential : Single. Current use: Institutional - Museum. This building, which was erected in 1897, is a typical example of a pioneer house. It is one of the oldest buildings in Kenhardt and is of great historical importance to the area.
9/2/048/0007	Dutch Reformed Church Hall, Church Street, Pofadder	Church building of rectangular form with saddle roof. Clocktower on front elevation. Gothic window This impressive church building which was officially consecrated in May 1922 is closely associated with the establishment and history of the Dutch Reformed Congregation (Namies). Type of site: Church Hall Previous use: Religious : Church. Current use: Religious : Church. This impressive church building which was officially consecrated in May 1922 is closely associated with the establishment and history of the Dutch Reformed Congregation (Namies).	Pofadder	Kenhardt	Provincial Heritage Site	29°07′38″S 19°23′41″E	Church building of rectangular form with saddle roof. Clocktower on front elevation. Gothic window This impressive church building which was officially consecrated in May 1922 is closely associated with the establishment and history of the Dutch Reformed Congregation (Namies). Type of site: Church Hall Previous use: Religious : Church. Current use: Religious : Church. This impressive church building which was officially consecrated in May 1922 is closely associated with the establishment and history of the Dutch Reformed Congregation (Namies).
9/2/055/0003-001	Mission Church, Kuruman Moffat Mission, Seodin Street, Kuruman	The foundations to the church were laid in 1830 by Robert Moffat. The town of Kuruman is situated 221 km north-west of Kimberley. Moffat’s Church stands in the grounds of the Seodin School 5 km north of the town. At the beginning of the 19th century Type of site: Church Current use: Church. One of the most important historical sites in the Northern Cape. Robert Moffat preached at the church.	Kuruman	Kuruman	Provincial Heritage Site	27°25′18″S 23°25′45″E	The foundations to the church were laid in 1830 by Robert Moffat. The town of Kuruman is situated 221 km north-west of Kimberley. Moffat’s Church stands in the grounds of the Seodin School 5 km north of the town. At the beginning of the 19th century Type of site: Church Current use: Church. One of the most important historical sites in the Northern Cape. Robert Moffat preached at the church.
9/2/055/0004	The Eye, cnr Voortrekker and Fontein Streets, Kuruman	The Eye of Kuruman is a permanent water source which has been recently fenced off. Three types of in The town of Kuruman owes its origin to The Eye. The Moffat Mission was established in Kuruman in 182 Type of site: Natural Current use: Other : spring. The Eye was described by Borchard's as early as 1802.	Kuruman	Kuruman	Provincial Heritage Site	27°27′49″S 23°26′10″E	The Eye of Kuruman is a permanent water source which has been recently fenced off. Three types of in The town of Kuruman owes its origin to The Eye. The Moffat Mission was established in Kuruman in 182 Type of site: Natural Current use: Other : spring. The Eye was described by Borchard's as early as 1802.
9/2/055/0008	Moffat Press, Moffat Mission, Seodin Street, Kuruman		Kuruman	Kuruman	Heritage Object	27°25′19″S 23°25′45″E	
9/2/066/0006	Messelpad Pass, Namaqualand District	Type of site: Pass Current use: Road.		Namaqualand	Provincial Heritage Site	29°54′22″S 17°39′25″E	Upload Photo
9/2/066/0010	Orbicule Koppie, Concordia, Namaqualand District	This koppie of concentrated orbicules is of indisputed scientific value in the study of rock types in the earth's crust. These orbicules are typically dioritic with a pegmatitic matrix and show signs of indentation and flattening. The koppie outcrops in t . This koppie of concentrated orbicules is of indisputed scientific value in the study of rock types in the earth's crust. These orbicules are typically dioritic with a pegmatitic matrix and show signs of indentation and flattening. The koppie outcrops in t		Namaqualand	Provincial Heritage Site	29°31′58″S 17°55′21″E	This koppie of concentrated orbicules is of indisputed scientific value in the study of rock types in the earth's crust. These orbicules are typically dioritic with a pegmatitic matrix and show signs of indentation and flattening. The koppie outcrops in t . This koppie of concentrated orbicules is of indisputed scientific value in the study of rock types in the earth's crust. These orbicules are typically dioritic with a pegmatitic matrix and show signs of indentation and flattening. The koppie outcrops in t
9/2/066/0011	Letterklip, Garies, Namaqualand District	This unique rock formation was fortified and occupied from 1901 to 1902 by the British forces during the Anglo-Boer War. Various regimental badges and officers' names are engraved in the rockface. This unique rock formation was fortified and occupied from 1901 to 1902 by the British forces during the Anglo-Boer War. Various regimental badges and officers' names are engraved in the rockface.	Garies	Namaqualand	Provincial Heritage Site	30°33′21″S 17°58′34″E	This unique rock formation was fortified and occupied from 1901 to 1902 by the British forces during the Anglo-Boer War. Various regimental badges and officers' names are engraved in the rockface. This unique rock formation was fortified and occupied from 1901 to 1902 by the British forces during the Anglo-Boer War. Various regimental badges and officers' names are engraved in the rockface. Media related to Letterklip at Wikimedia Commons
9/2/066/0012	Methodist Church and Manse, Leliefontein, Namaqualand District	This church was erected in 1855. It was the third church to be built at the Leliefontein mission station, which was founded by Barnabas Shaw in 1816. The church, in the predominantly neo-Gothic style, and the manse together form an important historic and Type of site: Parsonage, Church. This church was erected in 1855. It was the third church to be built at the Leliefontein mission station, which was founded by Barnabas Shaw in 1816. The church, in the predominantly neo-Gothic style, and the manse together form an important historic and	Leliefontein	Namaqualand	Provincial Heritage Site	30°18′53″S 18°05′03″E	This church was erected in 1855. It was the third church to be built at the Leliefontein mission station, which was founded by Barnabas Shaw in 1816. The church, in the predominantly neo-Gothic style, and the manse together form an important historic and Type of site: Parsonage, Church. This church was erected in 1855. It was the third church to be built at the Leliefontein mission station, which was founded by Barnabas Shaw in 1816. The church, in the predominantly neo-Gothic style, and the manse together form an important historic and
9/2/066/0014	Steam Locomotive 'Clara', O'Okiep Copper Company Museum, Nababeep, Namaqualand District	Clara is one of the last remaining steam locomotives used for conveying copper ore on the historic rail section from Okiep and Nababeep to Port Nolloth. The locomotive was used from 1890 to 1941. Type of site: Locomotive. Clara is one of the last remaining steam locomotives used for conveying copper ore on the historic rail section from Okiep and Nababeep to Port Nolloth. The locomotive was used from 1890 to 1941.	Nababeep	Namaqualand	Heritage Object		Upload Photo
9/2/066/0016	Old smoke stack, Okiep, Namaqualand District	This old smoke stack, which dates from 1880, was erected by the then Cape Copper Company to provide energy to the nearby pumping engine so as to pump water from the mine shafts. In 1952 it was declared a monument in memory of the pioneer copper miners in. This old smoke stack, which dates from 1880, was erected by the then Cape Copper Company to provide energy to the nearby pumping engine so as to pump water from the mine shafts. In 1952 it was declared a monument in memory of the pioneer copper miners in	Okiep	Namaqualand	Provincial Heritage Site	29°35′55″S 17°52′59″E	This old smoke stack, which dates from 1880, was erected by the then Cape Copper Company to provide energy to the nearby pumping engine so as to pump water from the mine shafts. In 1952 it was declared a monument in memory of the pioneer copper miners in. This old smoke stack, which dates from 1880, was erected by the then Cape Copper Company to provide energy to the nearby pumping engine so as to pump water from the mine shafts. In 1952 it was declared a monument in memory of the pioneer copper miners in
9/2/066/0017	Cornish pump building, Okiep, Namaqualand District	This unique pump engine, typical of that invented by Thomas Newcomen of Cornwall in 1712, was used to pump water from the O'Okiep mine during the period 1882 to 1929. The pump engine was restored in 1965-1968. This unique pump engine, typical of that invented by Thomas Newcome of Cornwall in 1712, was used to pump water from the O'Okiep mine during the period 1882 to 1929. The pump engine was restored in 1965-1968.	Okiep	Namaqualand	Provincial Heritage Site	29°35′57″S 17°52′58″E	This unique pump engine, typical of that invented by Thomas Newcomen of Cornwall in 1712, was used to pump water from the O'Okiep mine during the period 1882 to 1929. The pump engine was restored in 1965-1968. This unique pump engine, typical of that invented by Thomas Newcome of Cornwall in 1712, was used to pump water from the O'Okiep mine during the period 1882 to 1929. The pump engine was restored in 1965-1968.
9/2/066/0018	Roman Catholic Mission Station, Pella, Namaqualand District	Type of site: Mission Station Current use: Mission Station.	Pella, Pella Mission	Namaqualand	Provincial Heritage Site	29°02′00″S 19°09′20″E	Type of site: Mission Station Current use: Mission Station.
9/2/066/0019	Dutch Reformed Church, Pieter Malan Street, Springbok	This impressive church was built in 1921 of dressed stone by the builder F. W. van den Houven. Dr W. P. Steenkamp, well-known theologian, physician and parliamentarian, was the driving force behind the programme to build this church. Type of site: Church. This impressive church was built in 1921 of dressed stone by the builder F W van den Houven. Dr W P Steenkamp, well-known theologian, physician and parliamentarian, was the driving force behind the programme to build this church.	Springbok	Namaqualand	Provincial Heritage Site	29°40′00″S 17°53′04″E	This impressive church was built in 1921 of dressed stone by the builder F. W. van den Houven. Dr W. P. Steenkamp, well-known theologian, physician and parliamentarian, was the driving force behind the programme to build this church. Type of site: Church. This impressive church was built in 1921 of dressed stone by the builder F W van den Houven. Dr W P Steenkamp, well-known theologian, physician and parliamentarian, was the driving force behind the programme to build this church.
9/2/066/0020	Copper smelting chimney, Springbok	The town of Springbok is closely associated with the history of the exploitation of copper in South Africa. The chimney of the old smelting furnace on the outskirts of the town bears witness to the earliest developments of this industry. The first exploit.	Springbok	Namaqualand	Provincial Heritage Site	29°39′31″S 17°53′22″E	The town of Springbok is closely associated with the history of the exploitation of copper in South Africa. The chimney of the old smelting furnace on the outskirts of the town bears witness to the earliest developments of this industry. The first exploit.
9/2/066/0021	Old Synagogue and First Dutch Reformed Church, Synagogue Street, Springbok	This oblong stone building that was erected in 1877 was the first Ned. Geref. Church building in Springbok. It was restored in 1899 and served increasingly as a church building until 1921. The adjacent Jewish Synagogue was erected by M. Klawansky in 1929. Type of site: Synagogue, Church. This oblong stone building that was erected in 1877 was the first Ned. Geref. Church building in Springbok. It was restored in 1899 and served increasingly as a church building until 1921. The adjacent Jewish Synagogue was erected by M. Klawansky in 1929.	Springbok	Namaqualand	Provincial Heritage Site	29°39′57″S 17°52′51″E	This oblong stone building that was erected in 1877 was the first Ned. Geref. Church building in Springbok. It was restored in 1899 and served increasingly as a church building until 1921. The adjacent Jewish Synagogue was erected by M. Klawansky in 1929. Type of site: Synagogue, Church. This oblong stone building that was erected in 1877 was the first Ned. Geref. Church building in Springbok. It was restored in 1899 and served increasingly as a church building until 1921. The adjacent Jewish Synagogue was erected by M. Klawansky in 1929.
9/2/066/0021-001	Old Synagogue, Synagogue Street, Springbok	Type of site: Synagogue Previous use: Synagogue.	Springbok	Namaqualand	Provincial Heritage Site		Type of site: Synagogue Previous use: Synagogue.
9/2/066/0021-002	First Dutch Reformed Church, Synagogue Street, Springbok	Type of site: Church Previous use: Church.	Springbok	Namaqualand	Provincial Heritage Site	29°39′57″S 17°52′51″E	Type of site: Church Previous use: Church.
9/2/066/0022	Old All Saints Church, Springbok	Type of site: Church.	Springbok	Namaqualand	Provincial Heritage Site	29°39′51″S 17°52′56″E	Type of site: Church.
9/2/066/0024-002	Old Church, Rhenish Mission Complex, Steinkopf	Type of site: Church.	Steinkopf	Namaqualand	Provincial Heritage Site	29°15′22″S 17°44′05″E	Upload Photo
9/2/066/0031	Riethuis horsemill, Roodeklip Heuwel, Namaqualand District	Type of site: Horsemill.		Namaqualand	Provincial Heritage Site	30°07′17″S 17°24′40″E	Upload Photo
9/2/067/0003	Old Anglican Church, Shaw Street, Noupoort	The stone church in the neo-Gothic style was erected in 1901 by British troops, who had their headquarters at Noupoort, and is intimately associated with the history of the town. Type of site: Church. The stone church in the neo-Gothic style was erected in 1901 by British troops, who had their headquarters at Noupoort, and is intimately associated with the history of the town.	Noupoort	Noupoort	Provincial Heritage Site	31°10′41″S 24°57′09″E	The stone church in the neo-Gothic style was erected in 1901 by British troops, who had their headquarters at Noupoort, and is intimately associated with the history of the town. Type of site: Church. The stone church in the neo-Gothic style was erected in 1901 by British troops, who had their headquarters at Noupoort, and is intimately associated with the history of the town.
9/2/067/0004	Anglo-Boer War Blockhouse, Hospital Hill, Noupoort	The Blockhouse is the only remaining one of its type erected during the Anglo-Boer War. Unlike the m During the Anglo-Boer War (1899-19020 Noupoort was an important military establishment, with both la Type of site: Blockhouse Previous use: Military : ABW Blockhouse. Current use: Blockhouse. The structure remains unaltered, except in that some of the shooting ports have been covered as a re	Noupoort	Noupoort	Provincial Heritage Site	31°10′30″S 24°56′52″E	The Blockhouse is the only remaining one of its type erected during the Anglo-Boer War. Unlike the m During the Anglo-Boer War (1899-19020 Noupoort was an important military establishment, with both la Type of site: Blockhouse Previous use: Military : ABW Blockhouse. Current use: Blockhouse. The structure remains unaltered, except in that some of the shooting ports have been covered as a re Media related to Anglo-Boer War Blockhouse, Hospital Hill, Noupoort at Wikimedia Commons
9/2/071/0004	Reformed Church, Philipstown	Stone church of rectangular form with saddle roof and end gables with decorative fanlights. Quoinin 1864 was the year in which the congregation was established. A temporary church was then used. This classical church the cornerstone of which was laid on 30 September 1876, was completed in December 1878 and consecrated on 10 January 1879. Type of site: Church Previous use: Religious : Church. Current use: Religious : Church. The cornerstone of this classical church was laid on 30 September 1876. The building was completed in December 1878 and consecrated on 10 January 1879.	Philipstown	Philipstown	Provincial Heritage Site	30°26′12″S 24°28′22″E	Upload Photo
9/2/071/0005	Magistrate's Court, Market Street, Philipstown	Type of site: Courthouse.	Philipstown	Philipstown	Register	30°26′08″S 24°28′24″E	Type of site: Courthouse.
9/2/071/0007	Teich house complex, Sofia Street, Philipstown	The complex is clearly Georgian influenced with symmetrical bays and fine cornice mouldings. Decorat Type of site: House Current use: Residential: House. The Teich House complex is one of the finest examples of Karoo architecture in the Winterveld area.	Philipstown	Philipstown	Provisional Protection	30°26′11″S 24°28′18″E	Upload Photo
9/2/074/0005	First and Second Dutch Reformed Churches, Danielskuil	Rectangular stone buildings with saddle roofs. The Second church has Gothic windows on the front fac The corner stone of the First Dutch Reformed Church was laid on 17 December 1894. Type of site: Church Current use: Religious.	Danielskuil	Postmasburg	Provincial Heritage Site	28°10′46″S 23°33′03″E	Rectangular stone buildings with saddle roofs. The Second church has Gothic windows on the front fac The corner stone of the First Dutch Reformed Church was laid on 17 December 1894. Type of site: Church Current use: Religious.
9/2/074/0007	Old Police Station complex, Rhodes Street, Danielskuil	Type of site: Police Station.	Danielskuil	Postmasburg	Register	28°10′31″S 23°33′12″E	Upload Photo
9/2/074/0009	Anglo-Boer War Blockhouse, Danielskuil	The dry stone walled, circular blockhouse at Danielskuil is rare, if not unique remaining example of On 5 January 1901, a boer force attached the outnumbered garrison but were forced to withdreay becau Type of site: Blockhouse Previous use: Military : ABW Blockhouse. Current use: Military. It was erected by the British Garrison stationed there during the Anglo-Boer War (1899-1902) under t	Danielskuil	Postmasburg	Provincial Heritage Site	28°11′05″S 23°31′48″E	The dry stone walled, circular blockhouse at Danielskuil is rare, if not unique remaining example of On 5 January 1901, a boer force attached the outnumbered garrison but were forced to withdreay becau Type of site: Blockhouse Previous use: Military : ABW Blockhouse. Current use: Military. It was erected by the British Garrison stationed there during the Anglo-Boer War (1899-1902) under t
9/2/075/0004	Anglo-Boer War Blockhouse, Prieska Koppie, Prieska	The fort is hexagonal in form This stone fort was erected in 1900 by British soldiers to strengthen their position at Prieska. The structure, which is hexagonal, -is a good example of the preserverance and excellent craftsmanship of the British soldiers during the Anglo Boer War (1899 Type of site: Blockhouse Previous use: Military : ABW Blockhouse. Current use: Unused.	Prieska	Prieska	Provincial Heritage Site	29°40′11″S 22°45′24″E	The fort is hexagonal in form This stone fort was erected in 1900 by British soldiers to strengthen their position at Prieska. The structure, which is hexagonal, -is a good example of the preserverance and excellent craftsmanship of the British soldiers during the Anglo Boer War (1899 Type of site: Blockhouse Previous use: Military : ABW Blockhouse. Current use: Unused.
9/2/075/0005	Dutch Reformed Church, Church Street, Prieska	Type of site: Church.	Prieska	Prieska	Register	29°39′57″S 22°44′55″E	Upload Photo
9/2/075/0007	Old Municipal Cemetery, Prieska	A well maintained cemetery in which the graves of British soldiers who died during the Anglo-Boer Wa The cemetery dates back to c 1900 as indicated by the earliest war graves. Type of site: Cemetery Municipal Current use: Religious: Cemetery. The graveyard is of aesthetic interest. The war graves are of historic interest.	Prieska	Prieska	Register	29°40′30″S 22°45′27″E	Upload Photo
9/2/091/0001	Dutch Reformed Church, Sutherland	Type of site: Church Current use: Church : Dutch Reformed.	Sutherland	Sutherland	Provincial Heritage Site	32°23′39″S 20°39′37″E	Type of site: Church Current use: Church : Dutch Reformed.
9/2/105/0003	Anglo-Boer War Blockhouse, Erf 381, River Street, Warrenton	The Blockhouse is a single storeyed of square form with a pyramidal roof and triangular slatted roof The Royal Engineers under command of Lt.Col. C D Learoyd constructed a total of 388 blockhouses in t Type of site: Blockhouse Current use: Unused. Situated to protect strategic positions along the Vaal River during the Anglo-Boer War the Blockhous	Warrenton	Warrenton	Provincial Heritage Site	28°05′32″S 24°52′16″E	Upload Photo
9/2/105/0004	Anglo-Boer War Blockhouse, Warrenton Kultuuroord, Erf 327, Warrenton	Four masonry blockhouses are known to survive today. Three are simple rectangular design. The Royal Engineers under command of Lt Col C D Learoyd constructed a total of 388 blockhouses. Type of site: Blockhouse Current use: Military - Blockhouse. Situated to protect strategic positions along the Vaal River during the Anglo-Boer War (1899-1902) t	Warrenton	Warrenton	Provincial Heritage Site	28°07′37″S 24°50′27″E	Upload Photo
9/2/107/0001	Corbelled building, Goraas, Williston District	Stone corbelled building, circular in plan. Roughly plastered and whitewashed. Interior diameter approximately 5,5 metres. Flanked by other interesting vernacular stone buildings. Far to the north of Beaufort West stretch the hard, parched plains of Williston and Carnarvon. On many farms in that area corbelled houses or so-called klip rondawels may still be seen. These dwellings are interesting examples of the ingenuity of the earli Type of site: Corbelled House Previous use: Dwelling. Current use: Museum. 62km from Williston take the turn-off marked 'Goraas'. The buildings are located approximately 4,5km from turn-off.. This corbelled house is an example of the ingenuity of the first settlers in this area and is an important relic of the architectural history, Cultural and National, in South Africa.		Williston	Provincial Heritage Site	31°11′19″S 21°31′05″E	Upload Photo
9/2/107/0002	Corbelled building, Schuinshoogte, Williston District	Circular stone corbelled building. Roughly plastered and whitewashed. Interior diameter approximately 5,5 metres. Far to the north of Beaufort West stretch the hard, parched plains of Williston and Carnarvon. On many farms in that area corbelled houses or so-called klip rondawels may still be seen. These dwellings are interesting examples of the ingenuity of the earli Type of site: Corbelled House Previous use: Dwelling. Current use: Store. 15km. On the older, now deserted, farmstead of Schuinshoogte is a very fine circular corbelled hut which was made the subject of a painting by Vera Volschenk in 1955. This painting is in the possession of the owner of the farm, Mr G S Esterhuysen, who, although		Williston	Provincial Heritage Site	31°15′10″S 21°21′35″E	Upload Photo
9/2/107/0003	Corbelled building, Arbeidersfontein, Williston District	Square stone corbelled building. Internal dimension approximately 5,5 meters; whitewashed. Rectangular flat-roofed extension. Far to the north of Beaufort West stretch the hard, parched plains of Williston and Carnarvon. On many farms in that area corbelled houses or so-called klip rondawels may still be seen. These dwellings are interesting examples of the ingenuity of the earli Type of site: Corbelled House Previous use: Dwelling. Current use: Not used. Corbelled building is 1km from turn-off, along a gravel road.. The original corbelled dwelling, built by Hendriks Esterhuyse in 1872, is almost identical with that at Klipkolk. It is rectangular in plan and has an internal length of 18ft. The walls are 2ft. 3ins. thick and the doorway, placed centrally on the front,		Williston	Provincial Heritage Site	31°14′45″S 21°15′27″E	Upload Photo
9/2/107/0004	Dutch Reformed Church, Robinsky Street, Williston	Imposing cruciform stone building with pointed Gothic windows and doorways. Porches on three sides. Corrugated iron roof. Sturdy tower with spire and weather-cock. Ornamental diagonal buttresses at corners. This neo-Gothic church, the cornerstone of which was laid on 12 November 1912, was erected by the builder Van der Hoven in the years 1912-1913 from locally procured stone and other material. The church was officially consecrated on 31 August 1913 by the R Type of site: Church Current use: Church : Dutch Reformed. This neo-Gothic church, the cornerstone of which was laid on 12 November 1912, was erected by the builder Van Der Hoven in the years 1912-1913 from locally procured stone and other material. The church was officially consecrated on 31 August 1913 by the R	Williston	Williston	Provincial Heritage Site	31°20′28″S 20°55′00″E	Imposing cruciform stone building with pointed Gothic windows and doorways. Porches on three sides. Corrugated iron roof. Sturdy tower with spire and weather-cock. Ornamental diagonal buttresses at corners. This neo-Gothic church, the cornerstone of which was laid on 12 November 1912, was erected by the builder Van der Hoven in the years 1912-1913 from locally procured stone and other material. The church was officially consecrated on 31 August 1913 by the R Type of site: Church Current use: Church : Dutch Reformed. This neo-Gothic church, the cornerstone of which was laid on 12 November 1912, was erected by the builder Van Der Hoven in the years 1912-1913 from locally procured stone and other material. The church was officially consecrated on 31 August 1913 by the R
9/2/107/0005	Corbelled building, Grootfontein, Williston District	Circular stone corbelled building, with adjacent flat-roofed extension. Roughly plastered and whitewashed. Far to the north of Beaufort West stretch the hard, parched plains of Williston and Carnarvon. On many farms in that area corbelled houses or so-called klip rondawels may still be seen. These dwellings are interesting examples of the ingenuity of the earli Type of site: Corbelled House Previous use: Dwelling. Current use: Store. 19,5 km from turn-off, along gravel road.. This corbelled house is an example of the ingenuity of the earliest white inhabitants in this area and are important relics of the cultural and national architectural history in South Africa.		Williston	Provincial Heritage Site	31°07′19″S 21°11′31″E	Circular stone corbelled building, with adjacent flat-roofed extension. Roughly plastered and whitewashed. Far to the north of Beaufort West stretch the hard, parched plains of Williston and Carnarvon. On many farms in that area corbelled houses or so-called klip rondawels may still be seen. These dwellings are interesting examples of the ingenuity of the earli Type of site: Corbelled House Previous use: Dwelling. Current use: Store. 19,5 km from turn-off, along gravel road.. This corbelled house is an example of the ingenuity of the earliest white inhabitants in this area and are important relics of the cultural and national architectural history in South Africa.
9/2/107/0006	Corbelled building, Brandwag, Williston District	Stone corbelled building square in plan; dry wall construction; very primitive. Type of site: Corbelled House Previous use: Dwelling. Current use: Disused. Take Williston - Fraserburg road for 27km. Turn left into a farm road and take it for 3km (after 1,1km there is a fork, take the road to the left).. This corbelled house is an example of the ingenuity of the earliest white stock farmers in this area and is an important, typically South African relic of this country's cultural and architectural heritage.		Williston	Provincial Heritage Site	31°35′32″S 21°04′20″E	Upload Photo
9/2/107/0007	Corbelled buildings, Jan Klaas Leegte, Williston District	Complex comprising large square corbelled building, small corbelled building, bucket pump, stone cattle kraal and shepherds house. Type of site: Corbelled House Follow the Williston - Fraserburg road for 21km. Turn right and follow the road for 1km. In their entirety, these structures, which are all situated on one farmstead, form a unique cultural-historic and architectural complex.		Williston	Provincial Heritage Site	31°29′00″S 21°01′56″E	Upload Photo
9/2/100/0007	Dutch Reformed Church, 67 Church Street, Victoria West	Building is a neo-Gothic hall church with moulded plain end-gables and a tower with a high spire (originally a castle-type tower). Planned in 1844 but was only partly completed when inaugurated in 1850. Enlarged in 1922. Type of site: Church. The church in Victoria West is one of the first constructed in the Northern Cape. It is largely unaltered.	Victoria West	Victoria West	Provincial Heritage Site	31°24′14″S 23°06′31″E	Upload Photo
