= Letterklip =

Rock formation in Namaqualand, South Africa

- "Lettered rock"
- Garies, South Africa
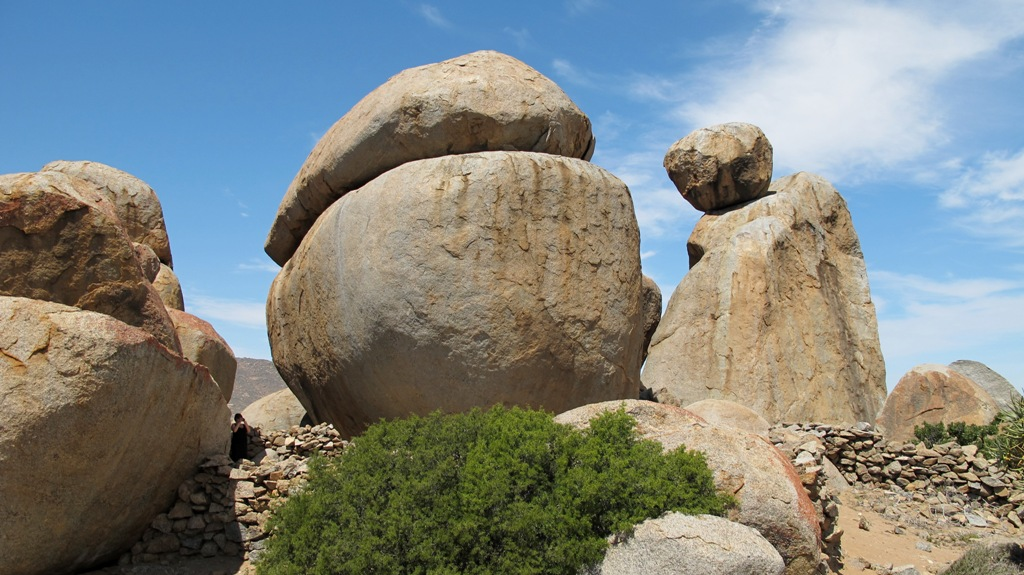
- The main fortified rock formation

Site information
- Type: Natural rock formation, Dry Wall construction.
- Controlled by: South Africa
- Open to the public: Yes
- Condition: Intact

Location
- Coordinates: 30°33′21″S 17°58′34″E

Site history
- Built: 1901
- Materials: Local stone.
- Events: Second Boer War

Garrison information
- Garrison: British Forces

The Letterklip, Afrikaans for "lettered rock", is a provincial heritage site in Namaqualand in the Northern Cape province of South Africa. The unique rock formation was fortified by dry stone walling; it was occupied from 1901 to 1902 by British forces during the Anglo-Boer War. Various regimental badges and officers' names are engraved in the rockface.

== History ==
In 1980, it was described in the Government Gazette of South Africa:

This unique rock formation was fortified and occupied from 1901 to 1902 by the British forces during the Anglo-Boer War. Various regimental badges and officers' names are engraved in the rockface.

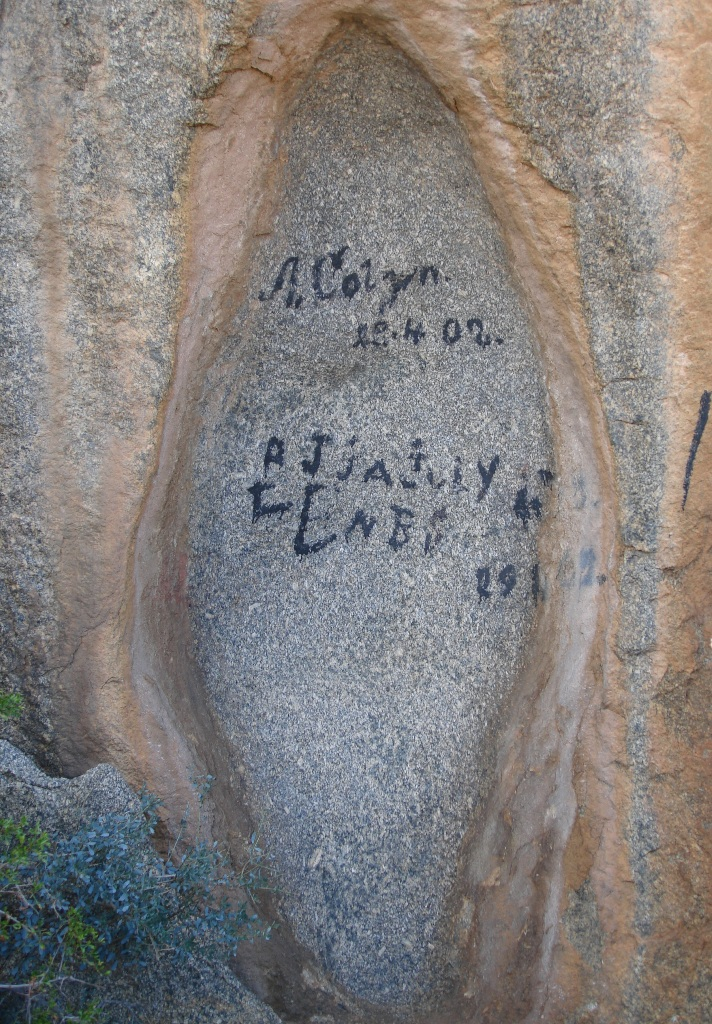
Engravings on the rocks

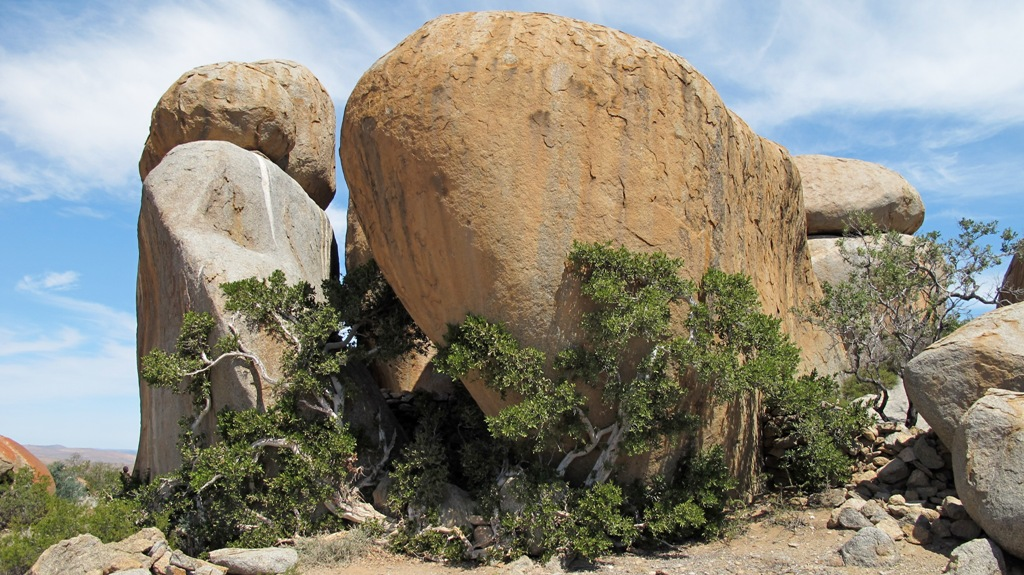

== See also ==
- List of Castles and Fortifications in South Africa
- Military history of South Africa
- List of castles in Africa
- History of South Africa
- List of castles
- List of forts
- Second Boer War
- List of heritage sites in Northern Cape
