= List of heritage sites in Colesberg =

This is a list of the heritage sites in Colesberg (Pixley ka Seme District Municipality) as recognised by the South African Heritage Resource Agency.

SAHRA identifier	Site name	Description	Town	District	NHRA status	Coordinates	Image
9/2/023/0002-023	1 Kort Street, Colesberg	Single storey with flat roof and projecting cornice. Stepped side parapet. Symmetrical three bay facade. Unusual spacing of windows. Edge pilasters and smooth door and window surrounds. No stoep, entrance at pavement level. Timber casement windows. Modern.	Colesberg	Colesberg	Register	30°43′15″S 25°05′41″E	Single storey with flat roof and projecting cornice. Stepped side parapet. Symmetrical three bay facade. Unusual spacing of windows. Edge pilasters and smooth door and window surrounds. No stoep, entrance at pavement level. Timber casement windows. Modern.
9/2/023/0003	Hebron, Colesberg District	Double storey building in the simple Georgian style. Unusual are asymmetical window arrangement on g Hebron is situated near Norvals Point one of the most important early crossings of the Orange River. Type of site: House Previous use: Residential : Single. Current use: Residential: House. 28 km from Colesberg on Norvalspont road The old house is an outstanding example of vernacular architecture. The threshing floor is an interesting relic of its time.		Colesberg	Provincial Heritage Site	30°42′40″S 25°24′50″E	Upload Photo
9/2/023/0004	Coniston House, 3 Ventershoek Street, Colesberg	Double storey with double pitched roof with moulded end gables, chimneys and shoulders. Single storey flat roofed extension with cornice. Symmetrical five bay facade with extension to the right. Stone stoep. Large 6x6 double sliding sash windows with louv Architectural style: Georgian. Type of site: House Current use: Residential. This double-storeyed building, which is predominantly in the Georgian style, was erected in 1835 by Thomas Plewman. He was an Irish Settler who emigrated in 1820 to South Africa on the ship Chapman.	Colesberg	Colesberg	Provincial Heritage Site	30°43′30″S 25°05′47″E	Double storey with double pitched roof with moulded end gables, chimneys and shoulders. Single storey flat roofed extension with cornice. Symmetrical five bay facade with extension to the right. Stone stoep. Large 6x6 double sliding sash windows with louv Architectural style: Georgian. Type of site: House Current use: Residential. This double-storeyed building, which is predominantly in the Georgian style, was erected in 1835 by Thomas Plewman. He was an Irish Settler who emigrated in 1820 to South Africa on the ship Chapman.
9/2/023/0005	Dutch Reformed Church, Colesberg	Modified cruciform plan form church with hipped roof. Belfry set in roof. Symmetrical facade with stone portico. Rough coarse stone base. Plastered core with pilasters and cornice. Plastered area is ruled and joined. Pediments above door openings Tall arc The foundation stone was laid on 29 November 1830 by W C Rhyneveldt, the Civil Commissioner of Graaf Type of site: Church Current use: Religious. The church is the major landmark in Colesberg and is closely associated with the development of the	Colesberg	Colesberg	Provincial Heritage Site	30°43′23″S 25°05′44″E	Modified cruciform plan form church with hipped roof. Belfry set in roof. Symmetrical facade with stone portico. Rough coarse stone base. Plastered core with pilasters and cornice. Plastered area is ruled and joined. Pediments above door openings Tall arc The foundation stone was laid on 29 November 1830 by W C Rhyneveldt, the Civil Commissioner of Graaf Type of site: Church Current use: Religious. The church is the major landmark in Colesberg and is closely associated with the development of the Media related to Dutch Reformed Church, Colesberg at Wikimedia Commons
9/2/023/0006	2 Sarel Cilliers Street, Colesberg	Double storey with flat roof and projecting cornice. Symmetrical three bay facade. Pebbledash wall finish. Raked jopints. Quoined edges and door and window surrounds. Low plastered (original stone) stoep. Verandah on wooden posts (evidence of decorative w This historic house is representative of the early Karoo architectural style. The house and the adjoining houses in the Street form an interesting historic and architectural complex. Architectural style: Karoo. Type of site: House Current use: Residential : House. This historic house is representative of the early Karoo architectural style. The house and the adjoining houses in Bell Street form an interesting historic and architectural complex.	Colesberg	Colesberg	Provincial Heritage Site	30°43′22″S 25°05′42″E	Double storey with flat roof and projecting cornice. Symmetrical three bay facade. Pebbledash wall finish. Raked jopints. Quoined edges and door and window surrounds. Low plastered (original stone) stoep. Verandah on wooden posts (evidence of decorative w This historic house is representative of the early Karoo architectural style. The house and the adjoining houses in the Street form an interesting historic and architectural complex. Architectural style: Karoo. Type of site: House Current use: Residential : House. This historic house is representative of the early Karoo architectural style. The house and the adjoining houses in Bell Street form an interesting historic and architectural complex.
9/2/023/0007	26 Bell Street, Colesberg	Single storey with flat roof and projecting cornice. Semi-circular string course cornice below. Stepped side parapet. Symmetrical three bay facade. Edge pilaster on left. Smooth surrounds to openings. Pebbledash plaster. Low stone stoep. 12x12 double slid Land first surveyed, and transferred in 1862. Type of site: House Current use: Residential : House. his historic house is representative of the early Karoo architectural style. The house, together with the adjoining houses in Bell Street, forms an interesting historic and architectural complex.	Colesberg	Colesberg	Provincial Heritage Site	30°43′22″S 25°05′41″E	Single storey with flat roof and projecting cornice. Semi-circular string course cornice below. Stepped side parapet. Symmetrical three bay facade. Edge pilaster on left. Smooth surrounds to openings. Pebbledash plaster. Low stone stoep. 12x12 double slid Land first surveyed, and transferred in 1862. Type of site: House Current use: Residential : House. his historic house is representative of the early Karoo architectural style. The house, together with the adjoining houses in Bell Street, forms an interesting historic and architectural complex.
9/2/023/0008	28 Bell Street, Colesberg	Single storey with flat roof and string coarse cornice. Stepped side parapet. Symmetrical three bay facade. Quoined edges and smooth surrounds to openings. Pebbledash plaster. Low stone stoep. 2x2 double sliding sash windows with louvered shutters on proj Land first surveyed, and transferred in 1862. Type of site: House Current use: Residential : House. This house is representative of early Karoo architecture. The building is square with fine cornice.	Colesberg	Colesberg	Provincial Heritage Site	30°43′23″S 25°05′41″E	Single storey with flat roof and string coarse cornice. Stepped side parapet. Symmetrical three bay facade. Quoined edges and smooth surrounds to openings. Pebbledash plaster. Low stone stoep. 2x2 double sliding sash windows with louvered shutters on proj Land first surveyed, and transferred in 1862. Type of site: House Current use: Residential : House. This house is representative of early Karoo architecture. The building is square with fine cornice.
9/2/023/0009	30 Bell Street, Colesberg	Single storey with flat roof and cornice. Asymmetrical two bay facade adjoining No 28, with edge pilaster on left and door frame surround. Low stoep. 12-light casement window with solid shutter. Horizontally divided door with one large panel in each leaf Land first surveyed, and transferred in 1862. Type of site: House Current use: Residential : House. This house is representative of early Karoo architecture. The building is square with fine cornice.	Colesberg	Colesberg	Provincial Heritage Site	30°43′19″S 25°05′45″E	Single storey with flat roof and cornice. Asymmetrical two bay facade adjoining No 28, with edge pilaster on left and door frame surround. Low stoep. 12-light casement window with solid shutter. Horizontally divided door with one large panel in each leaf Land first surveyed, and transferred in 1862. Type of site: House Current use: Residential : House. This house is representative of early Karoo architecture. The building is square with fine cornice.
9/2/023/0010	32 Bell Street, Colesberg	Single storey with flat roof and cornice. Stepped side parapet with string course. Asymmetrical four bay facade. Edge pilasters and smooth door and window surrounds. Low stoep. 12-light side hung casement windows with solid shutters. Horizontally divided Land first surveyed, and transferred in 1862. Type of site: House Previous use: Residential : Single. Current use: Residential : House. This house is representative of early Karoo architecture. The building is square with fine cornice.	Colesberg	Colesberg	Provincial Heritage Site	30°43′22″S 25°05′41″E	Single storey with flat roof and cornice. Stepped side parapet with string course. Asymmetrical four bay facade. Edge pilasters and smooth door and window surrounds. Low stoep. 12-light side hung casement windows with solid shutters. Horizontally divided Land first surveyed, and transferred in 1862. Type of site: House Previous use: Residential : Single. Current use: Residential : House. This house is representative of early Karoo architecture. The building is square with fine cornice.
9/2/023/0011	34 Bell Street, Colesberg	Single storey with double pitched roof and bargeboard. Symmetrical three bay facade. Sooth opening surrounds. Low stoep. 6x6 double sliding sash windows with louvred shutters. 4-panel door under 3-pane fanlight. Good condition. Well restored to original Land first surveyed, and transferred in 1862. Type of site: House Current use: Residential : House. This house is representative of early Karoo architecture. It is square with a beautiful cornice and interesting fan- light above the door.	Colesberg	Colesberg	Provincial Heritage Site	30°43′23″S 25°05′41″E	Single storey with double pitched roof and bargeboard. Symmetrical three bay facade. Sooth opening surrounds. Low stoep. 6x6 double sliding sash windows with louvred shutters. 4-panel door under 3-pane fanlight. Good condition. Well restored to original Land first surveyed, and transferred in 1862. Type of site: House Current use: Residential : House. This house is representative of early Karoo architecture. It is square with a beautiful cornice and interesting fan- light above the door.
9/2/023/0012	Reformed Church, Stockenstrom Street, Colesberg	Single volume longitudinal church, on raised podium, with no aisles or galleries. Three bay ashlar stonework facade with pilasters, pediment and small belfry (with inscription "ANNO 1862") Bullseye ventilator set in pediment. End plates of tension bars vi This church, the foundation stone of which was laid on 15 March 1862, was built in an adapted neo-Gothic style. It is one of the few remaining sandstone buildings in Colesberg. Type of site: Church Previous use: Religious : Church. Current use: Religious : Church. This church, the foundation stone of which was laid on 15 March 1862, was built in an adapted neo-Gothic style. It is one of the few remaining sandstone buildings in Colesberg.	Colesberg	Colesberg	Provincial Heritage Site	30°43′20″S 25°05′40″E	Single volume longitudinal church, on raised podium, with no aisles or galleries. Three bay ashlar stonework facade with pilasters, pediment and small belfry (with inscription "ANNO 1862") Bullseye ventilator set in pediment. End plates of tension bars vi This church, the foundation stone of which was laid on 15 March 1862, was built in an adapted neo-Gothic style. It is one of the few remaining sandstone buildings in Colesberg. Type of site: Church Previous use: Religious : Church. Current use: Religious : Church. This church, the foundation stone of which was laid on 15 March 1862, was built in an adapted neo-Gothic style. It is one of the few remaining sandstone buildings in Colesberg.
9/2/023/0013	3 D'Urban Row, Colesberg	Cape Georgian double storey with flat roof, projecting cornice and decorative parapet. Stepped on sides with string coarse. Symmetrical three bay facade. Low plastered stoep (verandah on plastered piers removed after 1980). Lower windows steel, upper 12x1 Type of site: House Current use: Residential: House. This property with its double storey house forms an integral part of the historic core of Colesberg. The house dates from the 1830s while the stables and rondavel-shaped building at the rear are presumably much older.	Colesberg	Colesberg	Provincial Heritage Site	30°43′11″S 25°05′46″E	Cape Georgian double storey with flat roof, projecting cornice and decorative parapet. Stepped on sides with string coarse. Symmetrical three bay facade. Low plastered stoep (verandah on plastered piers removed after 1980). Lower windows steel, upper 12x1 Type of site: House Current use: Residential: House. This property with its double storey house forms an integral part of the historic core of Colesberg. The house dates from the 1830s while the stables and rondavel-shaped building at the rear are presumably much older.
9/2/023/0013-001	1 D'Urban Row, Colesberg	Single storey with hipped roof, lean-to over forward projection. Asymmetrical facade with stoepkamer to left. Low plastered stoep (evidence of former verandah). 6x6 double sliding sash windows on stoepkamer. Simple four-panel doors. Fair condition. Origin Type of site: House Current use: Residential: House. This property with its double-storeyed Georgian house forms an integral part of the historic core of Colesberg. The house dates from the 1830s while the stables and rondavel shaped building at the rear are presumably much older.	Colesberg	Colesberg	Provincial Heritage Site	30°43′11″S 25°05′46″E	Single storey with hipped roof, lean-to over forward projection. Asymmetrical facade with stoepkamer to left. Low plastered stoep (evidence of former verandah). 6x6 double sliding sash windows on stoepkamer. Simple four-panel doors. Fair condition. Origin Type of site: House Current use: Residential: House. This property with its double-storeyed Georgian house forms an integral part of the historic core of Colesberg. The house dates from the 1830s while the stables and rondavel shaped building at the rear are presumably much older.
9/2/023/0015	Horse and Mill, Bell Street, Colesberg	Double storey warehouse with flat roof and string course cornice. Stepped side parapet with string course. asymmetrical facade with original hoisting beam. At ground floor, original stable door on left and carriage door on right. Upper floor has French do Type of site: Commercial Previous use: Commercial. Current use: Commercial. This square, double storeyed warehouse is the only remaining example of its kind in Colesberg and, together with the other historic buildings in Bell Street, forms, a unique architectural and historic group.	Colesberg	Colesberg	Provincial Heritage Site	30°43′15″S 25°05′47″E	Double storey warehouse with flat roof and string course cornice. Stepped side parapet with string course. asymmetrical facade with original hoisting beam. At ground floor, original stable door on left and carriage door on right. Upper floor has French do Type of site: Commercial Previous use: Commercial. Current use: Commercial. This square, double storeyed warehouse is the only remaining example of its kind in Colesberg and, together with the other historic buildings in Bell Street, forms, a unique architectural and historic group.
9/2/023/0015-001	Erf 329, Bell Street, Colesberg	Garden to warehouse. Type of site: Natural Current use: Natural. This square, double-storeyed warehouse is the only remaining example of its kind in Colesberg and, together with the other historic buildings in Bell Street, forms, a unique architectural and historic group.	Colesberg	Colesberg	Provincial Heritage Site	30°43′19″S 25°05′43″E	Upload Photo
9/2/023/0016	Horsemill, Old warehouse, Bell Street, Colesberg	Die perdemeul is uit geelhout gemaak behalwe die wiel wat van kiaat hout is. Dit is een van die wein This historic horse-mill, which is made of yellowwood, with a kiaat wheel, is one of the few complete horse-mills remaining in the Republic of South Africa. Type of site: Horsemill. This historic horse-mill, which is made of yellowwood, with a kiaat wheel, is one of the few complete horse-mills remaining in the Republic of South Africa.	Colesberg	Colesberg	Provincial Heritage Site	30°43′14″S 25°05′47″E	Die perdemeul is uit geelhout gemaak behalwe die wiel wat van kiaat hout is. Dit is een van die wein This historic horse-mill, which is made of yellowwood, with a kiaat wheel, is one of the few complete horse-mills remaining in the Republic of South Africa. Type of site: Horsemill. This historic horse-mill, which is made of yellowwood, with a kiaat wheel, is one of the few complete horse-mills remaining in the Republic of South Africa.
9/2/023/0017	Kemper Museum, Rhyneveld Square, Colesberg	Murray Street elevation: Giant blind aracades with cornices. Smooth edge pilasters supporting heavy cornice. Chimney above with small circular recess linked by diagonal walls to parapet. Stepped side parapet with string course. Single storey lean-to with The erf was purchased by the Colesberg Bank in 1861. A new building was erected in Oct Type of site: Commercial Previous use: Bank; Municipal offices. Current use: Museum.	Colesberg	Colesberg	Provincial Heritage Site	30°43′20″S 25°05′49″E	Murray Street elevation: Giant blind aracades with cornices. Smooth edge pilasters supporting heavy cornice. Chimney above with small circular recess linked by diagonal walls to parapet. Stepped side parapet with string course. Single storey lean-to with The erf was purchased by the Colesberg Bank in 1861. A new building was erected in Oct Type of site: Commercial Previous use: Bank; Municipal offices. Current use: Museum. Media related to Kemper Museum, Colesberg at Wikimedia Commons
9/2/023/0025	5 Stockenstrom Square, Colesberg	Single storey with hipped roof. Central Revival gable and cornice. Asymmetrical five bay facade. Quoined openings. Raked jointing. Hood moulds above openings. Low stoep with plastered walls. Verandah on concrete columns. 6x6 double sliding sash windows wi Erf 408 was transferred from the DR Church to Rev. Theopholis Atkinson on 9 January 1844. Erven 414 & Type of site: House Current use: Residential: House. Fine example of Karoo architecture. Early 20th century modifications made e.g. hipped roof, central g	Colesberg	Colesberg	Register	30°43′16″S 25°05′44″E	Upload Photo
9/2/023/0026	Gideon Joubert House, 9 D'Urban Row, Colesberg	Single storey with double pitched roof, bargeboard end gables and timber external staircase to right. Three bay symmetrical facade. Pebbledash plaster. Plastered stoep with steel railings. Ogee verandah on plastered piers (originally decoarative timber ve Property first transferred from the DR Church to Gideon Daniel Joubert on 9 February 1836. In 147 it Type of site: House Previous use: Residential/chapel. Current use: Residential. The property was the 'tuishuis' of Gideon Daniel Joubert, a wealthy farmer at Hebron and member of t	Colesberg	Colesberg	Register	30°43′02″S 25°05′53″E	Single storey with double pitched roof, bargeboard end gables and timber external staircase to right. Three bay symmetrical facade. Pebbledash plaster. Plastered stoep with steel railings. Ogee verandah on plastered piers (originally decoarative timber ve Property first transferred from the DR Church to Gideon Daniel Joubert on 9 February 1836. In 147 it Type of site: House Previous use: Residential/chapel. Current use: Residential. The property was the 'tuishuis' of Gideon Daniel Joubert, a wealthy farmer at Hebron and member of t
9/2/023/0027	Ortlepps Building, 30 Church Street, Colesberg	Double storey with flat roof and dentil cornice. Flanking pedimented pavilions with dentil cornices. Symmetrical three bay facade flanked by single bay pavilions. Ground floor pilasters supporting cornice at first floor level. Window hood mouldings on upper floor. The property was first transferred from the Dutch reformed Church to the estate of the Type of site: House Previous use: Residential. Current use: Residential. The building is of exceptional aesthetic and historic merit and is inextricably associated with the deve	Colesberg	Colesberg	Provisional Protection	30°43′09″S 25°05′54″E	Upload Photo
9/2/023/0028	Fleetwood Rawstorne House, 1 New Street, Colesberg	Single storey with flat roof, cornice and parapet, set back from street. Main facade facing New Street. Asymmetrical two bay facade flanked by bow-fronted wings with hood mouldings over openings. Low plastered stoep. Good stone wall with corner and interm The house was owned by Fleetwood Rawstorne (Snr) an ex-army officer who travelled with Type of site: House Previous use: Residential. Current use: Residential. This unusual flat-roofed, Karoo-Georgian residence with curved, forward projecting end b	Colesberg	Colesberg	Provincial Heritage Site	30°43′18″S 25°05′47″E	Single storey with flat roof, cornice and parapet, set back from street. Main facade facing New Street. Asymmetrical two bay facade flanked by bow-fronted wings with hood mouldings over openings. Low plastered stoep. Good stone wall with corner and interm The house was owned by Fleetwood Rawstorne (Snr) an ex-army officer who travelled with Type of site: House Previous use: Residential. Current use: Residential. This unusual flat-roofed, Karoo-Georgian residence with curved, forward projecting end b
9/2/023/0029	Colesberg Garage, 7 Sarel Cilliers Street, Colesberg	Rhyneveldt Street elevation Double storey with low-pitched hipped roof and light cornice. Asymmetrical five bay facade. Stone plinth. Smooth plastered walls. 12x12 double sliding sash windows. Upper windows boarded-up. Double-hung door with top panels gla The first property transaction registered was in 1834 when the erf was transferred from Type of site: Commercial Current use: Commercial. The building has been identiefied as a Grade 1 building in Colesberg in the NMC survey of Colesberg	Colesberg	Colesberg	Register	30°43′23″S 25°05′52″E	Upload Photo
9/2/023/0030	5–7 D'Urban Row, Colesberg	"Een geschenk aan den Ned Geref Kerkraad, voor de Zending Gemeente Colesberg, van den wel ed Heer P J Joubert en Echenote. 1906." "J Coetzee, Bouwmeester en Contractant" Single storeyd with hipped roof. Double pitched roof with decorative fretwork on gabl The first transfer of the property was from G L E Henifer to Petrus Joubert on 20 March Type of site: House Current use: Residential : House. The house has been identified as a grade 1 building of outstanding aesthetic/environmental merit in C	Colesberg	Colesberg	Register	30°43′04″S 25°05′53″E	Upload Photo
9/2/023/0031	Bordeaux, 7 Church Street, Colesberg	Single storey with hipped roof and decorative bargeboard dormer over entrance. Remains of stepped side parapet on right. Symmetrical five bay facade. Ruled joints, edge pilasters and smooth opening surrounds. Low stoep with precast balustrade. Verandah (w The property transfer for 'Bordeaux' took place in 1835 when the Dutch Reformed Church Type of site: House Current use: Residential. 'Bordeaux' is one of only two remaining examples of luxury Dorpshuise built by farmers in	Colesberg	Colesberg	Register	30°43′02″S 25°05′54″E	Upload Photo
9/2/023/0032	3 Rhyneveld Street, Colesberg	Single storey with flat roof and heavy cornice. Asymmetrical four bay facade. Smooth edge pilasters and opening surrounds. Pebbledash plaster. Low stone stoep with decorative timber fretwork balustrade. Ogee verandah on paired timber post and decorative f The first transfer of this property took place in 1858, when J Draper (Jnr) sole it to J Type of site: House Current use: Residential – House. This house and 'Bordeaux' are the only two remaining luxury 'dorpshuis' in Colesberg, Owned by weal	Colesberg	Colesberg	Register	30°43′23″S 25°05′47″E	Upload Photo
9/2/023/0033-001	11 Sarel Celliers Street, Colesberg	Sarel Celliers elevation Single storey with flat roof and heavy cornice with facebrick coping. Asymmetrical four bay facade behind verandah. Quoined opening surrounds and pilasters. Glazed-in verandah on face-brick walls and piers. Original 2x2 (to left s Type of site: House Current use: Residential: House. Intrinsic aesthetic/architectural merit	Colesberg	Colesberg	Register	30°43′24″S 25°05′53″E	Upload Photo
9/2/023/0033-002	21 D'Urban Row, Colesberg	Single storey with hipped roof. Symmetrical three bay facade. Face brick edge and quoining around openings and corners. High stone stoep with plastered walls and projecting staircase. Ogee verandah on plastered piers on three sides. Timber French doors wi Type of site: House Current use: Residential: House. Intrinsic aesthetic/architectural merit	Colesberg	Colesberg	Register	30°43′02″S 25°05′53″E	Upload Photo
9/2/023/0033-003	16 Campbell Street, Colesberg	Single storey with flat roof and cornice. Symmetrical three bay facade. Smooth edge pilasters. Pebbledash plaster. Low stone stoep. Steel windows. Modern door. Fair condition. Partly original appearance. Side wall of house continues to back of site with Type of site: House Current use: Residential: House. Intrinsic aesthetic/architectural merit	Colesberg	Colesberg	Register	30°43′04″S 25°05′59″E	Upload Photo
9/2/023/0033-004	5 Rhyneveld Street, Colesberg	Single storey with hipped roof. Asymmetrical four bay facade. Quoined edges and aperture surrounds. Low plastered stoep. Modern windows. Modern door with geometreic fanlight. French door on right side under louvred shutters. Good condition. Original app Type of site: House Current use: Residential: House. Intrinsic aesthetic/architectural merit	Colesberg	Colesberg	Register	30°43′22″S 25°05′48″E	Upload Photo
9/2/023/0033-006	13 Murray Street, Colesberg	Single storey with flat roof and cornice. Symmetrical three bay facade. Smooth edge pilasters and opening surrounds. Plastered stoep with semi-circular plastered stairs. 6x6 double sliding sash windows with louvred shutters on projecting hinges. Modern d Type of site: House Current use: Residential : House. Intrinsic aesthetic/architectural merit	Colesberg	Colesberg	Register	30°43′19″S 25°05′50″E	Upload Photo
9/2/023/0033-007	15 Bell Street, Colesberg	Single storey with hipped roof double pitched with bargeboards and finials on projecting wings. Symmetrical four bay facade flanked by projecting single bay wings. Smooth edge pilasters and smooth surrounds to door and windows. Facebrick faced stoep with Type of site: House Current use: Residential : House. Intrinsic aesthetic/architectural merit	Colesberg	Colesberg	Register	30°43′24″S 25°05′41″E	Single storey with hipped roof double pitched with bargeboards and finials on projecting wings. Symmetrical four bay facade flanked by projecting single bay wings. Smooth edge pilasters and smooth surrounds to door and windows. Facebrick faced stoep with Type of site: House Current use: Residential : House. Intrinsic aesthetic/architectural merit
9/2/023/0033-008	27 Murray Street, Colesberg	Single storey with flat roof but no cornice and small rectangular pediment. Side elevation flat parapet and no cornice. Symmetrical three bay facade. Quoined window and door surrounds and edge pilasters. Low stoep with bullnose verandah on bracketed woode Type of site: House Current use: Residential: House. Intrinsic aesthetic/architectural merit	Colesberg	Colesberg	Register	30°43′13″S 25°05′48″E	Upload Photo
9/2/023/0033-009	6 Murray Street, Colesberg	Single storey with flat roof and heavy cornice. Stepped side cornice. Symmetrical three bay facade. Smooth edge pilasters and door surround. Plastered stoep with pergola on plastered piers. Steel windows. Modern door. Good condition. Original appearance l Type of site: House Current use: Residential: House. Intrinsic aesthetic/architectural merit	Colesberg	Colesberg	Register	30°43′14″S 25°05′53″E	Upload Photo
9/2/023/0033-010	12 Rhyneveld Street, Colesberg	Single storey with double pitched roof. Gable facing street, under cornice, bargeboards and finial. Circular gable ventilator. Symmetrical three bay facade. Ruled horizontal and vertical joints. Low stoep with plastered walls. Verandah on precast concrete Type of site: House Current use: Residential: House. Intrinsic aesthetic/architectural merit	Colesberg	Colesberg	Register	30°43′21″S 25°05′49″E	Upload Photo
9/2/023/0033-011	32 Stockenstrom Street, Colesberg	Single storey with double pitched roof behind stepped parapet. Straight light cornice beneath parpapet with applied circular mouldings above. Symmetrical three bay facade. Smooth plaster with no door or window surrounds. Type of site: House Current use: Residential: House. Intrinsic aesthetic/architectural merit	Colesberg	Colesberg	Register	30°43′20″S 25°05′41″E	Upload Photo
9/2/023/0033-012	34 Stockenstrom Street, Colesberg	Single storey with hipped roof. Symmetrical three bay facade. Lateral additions. Raked joints and smooth window surrounds. Stone stoep with plastered walls. Gauze enclosed verandah with concrete Tuscan columns. 12x12 double sliding sash windows. Modern do Type of site: House Current use: Residential: House. Intrinsic aesthetic/architectural merit	Colesberg	Colesberg	Register	30°43′19″S 25°05′41″E	Upload Photo
9/2/023/0033-013	36 Stockenstrom Street, Colesberg	Single storey with flat roof and cornice. Stepped parapet with string course cornice. Symmetrical three bay facade. Smooth corner pilasters and door and window surrounds. Stone stoep with plastered walls and corner piers. 2x2 double sliding sash windows a Type of site: House Current use: Residential: House. Intrinsic aesthetic/architectural merit	Colesberg	Colesberg	Register	30°43′18″S 25°05′42″E	Upload Photo
9/2/023/0033-014	21 Church Street, Colesberg	Single storey with double pitched roof surmounted by four symmetrically placed chimneys. Moulded end gables with shoulders. Heavy cornice. Asymmetrical six bay facade. Hod mouldings to door and windows. No stoep. Replacement steel casements with louvred Type of site: Commercial Current use: Commercial: Shop. Intrinsic aesthetic/architectural merit	Colesberg	Colesberg	Register	30°43′15″S 25°05′50″E	Upload Photo
9/2/023/0033-015	9 Sarel Celliers Street, Colesberg	Single storey with flat roof and heavy cornice. Symmetrical three bay facade to main elevation, two bays to Rhyneveldt Street. Heavy quoined prominent edges and opening surrounds and pilasters. Low stoep with precast concrete balustrade. Verandah on preca Type of site: House Current use: Residential: House. Intrinsic aesthetic/architectural merit	Colesberg	Colesberg	Register	30°43′36″S 25°05′31″E	Upload Photo
9/2/023/0033-016	Ellerslie, Church Street, Colesberg	Single storey with flat roof and heavy cornice. Stepped parapet to side facade with unusual avve between cornice and string coarse. Symmetrical three bay facade. No stoep but plastered wall. Bullnose verandah on plastered piers. 12x12 double sliding sash Type of site: House Current use: Residential : House. Intrinsic aesthetic/architectural merit	Colesberg	Colesberg	Register	30°43′06″S 25°05′55″E	Upload Photo
9/2/023/0033-017	Erf 244 and 245, 7 Rhyneveld Street, Colesberg	Single storey with flat roof and heavy cornice and rounded string course below. Stepped side parapet. Asymmetrical five bay facade. Pebbledash plaster on left hand side. No stoep. Raised facebrick stoep wall. Steel windows. Modern door. Steel garage door Type of site: House Current use: Residential: House. Intrinsic aesthetic/architectural merit	Colesberg	Colesberg	Register	30°43′49″S 25°05′35″E	Upload Photo
9/2/023/0033-018	Cemetery, Church Street, Colesberg	Stone wall with iron railing. Good condition. Original appearance. Type of site: Cemetery Current use: Cemetery. Intrinsic aesthetic/architectural merit	Colesberg	Colesberg	Register	30°42′59″S 25°06′02″E	Upload Photo
9/2/023/0033-020	Bridge, Sarel Cilliers Street, Colesberg	Dressed stone piers with half-round top. Four steel tubed rails with steel balusters. Fourth pier is plastered. Type of site: Bridge Current use: Structural: Bridge. Intrinsic aesthetic/architectural merit	Colesberg	Colesberg	Register	30°43′36″S 25°05′34″E	Upload Photo
9/2/023/0033-021	Christ Church, Church Street, Colesberg	Entrance portico with small wooden bell-tower over nave and chancel, with no aisles. Steeply pitched roof. Wooden cross at both gable ridge ends. Decorative weathervane. Pebbledash plaster exterior, corner buttresses. Pointed arched doors and windows with Type of site: Church Current use: Church (Anglican). Intrinsic aesthetic/architectural merit	Colesberg	Colesberg	Register	30°43′00″S 25°05′59″E	Upload Photo
9/2/023/0033-023	Masonic Hall, Campbell Street, Colesberg	Single storey with pitched roof and timber bargeboards with finials. Lateral extension on left behind parapet with light cornice. Entrance porch on right. Good stone wall surrounding site with fine entrance piers and rough rounded coping (poor condition) Type of site: Recreational Current use: Recreational : Hall. Intrinsic aesthetic/architectural merit	Colesberg	Colesberg	Register	30°43′00″S 25°06′00″E	Upload Photo
9/2/023/0033-025	Erf 230 and 232, 28 Church Street, Colesberg	Single storey with double pitched roof, bargeboard and finial. Symmetrical three bay facade (one window replaced by door). Low stoep with plastered wall. Verandah on concrete columns. One 2x2 double sliding sash window on right. Central door is 4-panel do Type of site: Commercial Current use: Commercial: Shop. Intrinsic aesthetic/architectural merit	Colesberg	Colesberg	Register	30°43′09″S 25°05′54″E	Upload Photo
9/2/023/0033-026	8 Campbell Street, Colesberg	Single storey warehouse with double pitched roof. Asymmetrical facade with two entrances. Plaster above stone plinth. No stoep, two stairways to entrances. 6x6 double sliding sash windows. Modern doors. Fair condition. Largely original. Old stone wall at Type of site: Commercial Current use: Commercial: Warehouse. Intrinsic aesthetic/architectural merit	Colesberg	Colesberg	Register	30°43′00″S 25°06′00″E	Upload Photo
9/2/023/0033-027	49 Church Street, Colesberg	Asymmetrical villa. Hipped roof with double pitched roof over projection and vestigial turret on right hand corner. Asymmetrical facade with bay window under turret. No stoep. Ogee verandah on wooden posts. Steel window in projecting wing. 1x1 double slid Type of site: Commercial Current use: Commercial: Shop. Intrinsic aesthetic/architectural merit	Colesberg	Colesberg	Register	30°43′09″S 25°05′54″E	Upload Photo
9/2/023/0033-028	27 Church Street, Colesberg	Single storey with flat roof and heavy cornice. Asymmetrical five bay facade (right hand window now garage door). Edge pilasters and smooth door and opening surrounds. Recessed stoep. Plastered curved verandah walls. Verandah on plastered piers. 12x12 dou Type of site: Civic Old Magistrate's office Current use: Residential : House. Intrinsic aesthetic/architectural merit	Colesberg	Colesberg	Register	30°43′47″S 25°05′34″E	Upload Photo
9/2/023/0033-029	10 Rhyneveld Street, Colesberg	Single storey with hipped roof. Symmetrical three bay facade. Ruled joints. Low stone stoep with pergola on plastered piers. 12x12 double sliding sash windows with louvred shutters. 4-panel door with original spoked bottom hung fanlight. Very good condit Type of site: House Current use: Residential: House. Intrinsic aesthetic/architectural merit	Colesberg	Colesberg	Register	33°55′48″S 18°51′43″E	Upload Photo
9/2/023/0033-030	23 Ventershoek Street, Colesberg	Single storey with low double pitched roof, projecting cornice and pedimented stepped parapet. Symmetrical three bay facade. Edge pilasters and smooth opening surrounds. Ruled jointing. Stoep with facebrick wall entered laterally. Ogee verandah on facebri Type of site: House Current use: Residential: House. Intrinsic aesthetic/architectural merit	Colesberg	Colesberg	Register	30°43′27″S 25°05′46″E	Upload Photo
9/2/023/0033-031	President Kruger Street, Colesberg	Single storey with flat roof and projecting cornice. Stepped side parapet with string course. Symmetrical three bay facade adjoined by symmetrical garage. Edge pilaster and smooth surrounds to openings. Raised stone stoep. Cement top. 2x2 sliding sash win Type of site: House Current use: Residential: House. Intrinsic aesthetic/architectural merit	Colesberg	Colesberg	Register	30°43′30″S 25°05′39″E	Upload Photo
9/2/023/0033-032	6 Grey Street, Colesberg	Single storey with shallow-pitched hipped roof. Simple chimney. Symmetrical three bay facade flanked by single bay wings (stoepkamers). Ruled joints and rusticated openings. Low stoep with facebrick wall. Verandah on facebrick piers. Steel windows on wing Type of site: House Current use: Residential: House. Intrinsic aesthetic/architectural merit	Colesberg	Colesberg	Register	30°43′35″S 25°05′43″E	Upload Photo
9/2/023/0033-033	2 Ventershoek Street, Colesberg	Single storey with pitched (originally flat) roof, projecting cornice and stepped parapet. Extension has stepped parapet above projecting cornice. Symmetrical three bay facade with edge pilasters and smooth opening surrounds. Low stone stoep. 2x2 double s Type of site: House Current use: Residential: House. Intrinsic aesthetic/architectural merit	Colesberg	Colesberg	Register	30°43′30″S 25°05′47″E	Upload Photo
9/2/023/0033-034	11 D'Urban Row, Colesberg	Single storey with flat roof and projecting cornice. Stepped parapet on side with string coarse. Asymmetrical four bay facade. Pebbledash plaster. Edge pilasters and smooth door and window surrounds. Stone stoep with later pergola with facebrick paving on Type of site: House Current use: Residential: House. Intrinsic architectural/ aesthetic merit	Colesberg	Colesberg	Register	30°43′10″S 25°05′48″E	Upload Photo
9/2/023/0033-035	20 Church Street, Colesberg	Double storey with shallow pitched roof and parpapet end gables under shoulders. Symmetrical five bay facade with two entrance doors. Low stoep. Verandah on concrete columns. Upper and lower supports do not line-up. On middle portion of verandah wall rema Type of site: House Current use: Residential: House. Intrinsic aesthetic/architectural merit	Colesberg	Colesberg	Register	30°43′00″S 25°06′00″E	Upload Photo
9/2/023/0033-036	35 Church Street, Colesberg	Single storey with hipped roof. Asymmetical five bay facade. Raked joints. Smooth opening surrounds. No stoep but plastered wall with applied semi-circular buttresses and decorative panels. Verandah on plastered piers with end walls partially enclosed. 2x Type of site: House Current use: Residential: House. Intrinsic aesthetic/architectural merit	Colesberg	Colesberg	Register	30°43′00″S 25°06′00″E	Upload Photo
9/2/023/0033-037	4 Low Street, Colesberg	Single storey with pyramidal hipped roof and bargeboard gabled projecting wing with finial. Asymmetrical two bay with projecting symmetrical wing with projecting bay window. High stoep with plastered walls. Verandah (on two sides) with plastered piers. Ba Type of site: House Current use: Residential : House. Intrinsic aesthetic/architectural merit	Colesberg	Colesberg	Register	30°43′38″S 25°05′32″E	Upload Photo
9/2/023/0033-038	24 Stockenstrom Street, Colesberg	Single storey with flat roof and cornice. Stepped side parapet with later steel beneath. Symmetrical three bay facade. Smooth window surrounds. Stone stoep with plastered walls. Verandah on Ionic columns; ends walled in with steel windows. 2x2 do Type of site: House Current use: Residential: House. Intrinsic aesthetic/architectural merit	Colesberg	Colesberg	Register	30°43′12″S 25°05′46″E	Upload Photo
9/2/023/0033-039	6 Church Street, Colesberg	Single storey with recent hipped roof (originally flat). Asymmetrical four bay facade. Edge pilasters and smooth opening surrounds. Low stoep with decorative facebrick wall. Pebbledash plaster. Ogee verandah on painted facebrick piers. Original windows be Type of site: House Current use: Residential: House. Intrinsic aesthetic/architectural merit	Colesberg	Colesberg	Register	30°43′00″S 25°06′00″E	Upload Photo
9/2/023/0033-040	12 Stockenstrom Square, Colesberg	Single storey with double pitched roof and end gables. Symmetrical five bay facade (despite irregularity in roof). Flat roofed extension with cornice to the left. Pebbledash plaster finish. Verandah on facebrick piers. 6x6 double sliding sash windows. Mod Type of site: House Current use: Residential : House. Intrinsic aesthetic/architectural merit	Colesberg	Colesberg	Register	30°43′18″S 25°05′42″E	Upload Photo
9/2/023/0033-041	16 Stockenstrom Street, Colesberg	Single storey with hipped roof and triangular dormer louvred ventilator. Asymmetrical four bay facade. Elaborate door and window surrounds. Low plastered stoep with precast balustrade. Verandah on precast concrete columns. Partially enclosed on left, comp Type of site: House Current use: Residential : House. Intrinsic aesthetic/architectural merit	Colesberg	Colesberg	Register	30°43′17″S 25°05′42″E	Upload Photo
9/2/023/0033-042	17 Ventershoek Street, Colesberg	Single storey with flat roof and profiled cornice with flat parapet above. Flanking wings with string course cornice. Asymmetrical four bay facade flanked by symmetrical recessed wings (probably later, but sensitively designed). High stone stoep with plas Type of site: House Current use: Residential: House. Intrinsic aesthetic/architectural merit	Colesberg	Colesberg	Register	30°43′27″S 25°05′46″E	Upload Photo
9/2/023/0033-043	4 Bell Street, Colesberg	Single storey with hipped roof. Asymmetrical four bay facade. Low stoep with cast-iron railings. Ogee verandah on brick piers to front and left facades (evidence of original wooden verandah). One 2x2 double sliding sash window with louvred shutters. Two Type of site: House Current use: Residential : House. Intrinsic aesthetic/architectural merit	Colesberg	Colesberg	Register	30°43′22″S 25°05′43″E	Upload Photo
9/2/023/0033-044	39 Church Street, Colesberg	Single storey with shallow double pitched roof and bargeboard ends with finials. Later chimney to right. Asymmetrical five bay facade (left window replaced by door) Raked joints. Keystones above all original openings. No stoep but plastered wall. Ogee ver Type of site: House Current use: Residential: House. Intrinsic aesthetic/architectural merit	Colesberg	Colesberg	Register	30°43′00″S 25°06′00″E	Upload Photo
9/2/023/0033-045	10 Bell Street, Colesberg	Single storey with double pitched roof behind stepped curvilinear gable with string coarse cornice. Symmetrical three bay facade. Pebbledash plaster. Low stoep with plastered wall. Verandah on decorative plastered piers. Semi-enclosed end walls. 12x12 dou Type of site: House Current use: Residential : House. Intrinsic aesthetic/architectural merit	Colesberg	Colesberg	Register	30°43′22″S 25°05′43″E	Upload Photo
9/2/023/0033-046	18 Kort Street, Colesberg	Single storey with flat roof and cornice. Symmetrical three bay facade with projecting stoepkamer on left. Raked joints with flush door and windows surrounds. Stone stoep with low plastered walls and projecting steps. 2x2 double sliding sash windows. Louv Type of site: House Current use: Residential : House. Intrinsic aesthetic/architectural merit	Colesberg	Colesberg	Register	30°43′16″S 25°05′41″E	Upload Photo
9/2/023/0033-047	Erf 516, Church Street, Colesberg	Single storey with flat roof and cornice with flat triangular parapet above. Symmetrical five bay facade (probably not original). No stoep. 18-light double sliding sash windows with louvred shutters. Modern door with 3-pane fanlight over. Good condition. Type of site: House Current use: Residential : House. Intrinsic aesthetic/architectural merit	Colesberg	Colesberg	Register	30°43′07″S 25°05′55″E	Upload Photo
9/2/023/0033-048	11 Bell Street, Colesberg	Single storey with double pitched roof with bargeboards and finials. Symmterical three bay facade with quoined edges and door and window surrounds. Pebbledash plaster. High plastered stoep with plastered wall. Ogee verandah on plastered piers and end wall Type of site: House Current use: Residential : House. Intrinsic aesthetic/architectural merit	Colesberg	Colesberg	Register	30°43′23″S 25°05′41″E	Upload Photo
9/2/023/0033-049	Erf 505, 64 Church Street, Colesberg	Single storey with flat roof, two vestigial turrets on front facade. Symmetrical three bay facade. Quoining at edges and around openings. Raised stoep with plastered wall and stairs. Pedimented ogee verandah on wooden posts, partially enclosed and later v Type of site: House Current use: Residential: House. Intrinsic aesthetic/architectural merit	Colesberg	Colesberg	Register	30°43′00″S 25°06′00″E	Upload Photo
9/2/023/0033-050	2 Stockenstrom Square, Colesberg	Single storey with shallow double-pitched roof but no gables. Ridge finials at both ends. Symmetrical three bay facade. Smooth window and door surrounds. Low stoep with rough slate set into plaster wall. Ogee verandah (roof – Emu brand – Wolverhamton) on Type of site: House Current use: Residential : House. Intrinsic aesthetic/architectural merit	Colesberg	Colesberg	Register	30°43′16″S 25°05′43″E	Upload Photo
9/2/023/0033-051	Erf 443, Stockenstrom Square, Colesberg	Single storey with flat roof and projecting cornice. Stepped parapet with string coarse. Symmetrical three bay facade. Pebbledash plaster with smooth corner pilasters. Low stoep without walls. Steel windows. Modern door. Good condition. Largely original a Type of site: House Current use: Residential : House. Intrinsic aesthetic/architectural merit	Colesberg	Colesberg	Register	30°43′16″S 25°05′43″E	Upload Photo
9/2/023/0033-052	1 Stockenstrom Square, Colesberg	Single storey with double-pitched roof and moulded end gables with false chimneys. Front pitch steeper than back. Off-centre chimney on ridge line. Symmetrical three bay facade. Pebbledash plinth with smooth plaster above. Low stoep with plastered walls. Type of site: House Current use: Residential : House. Intrinsic aesthetic/architectural merit	Colesberg	Colesberg	Register	30°43′17″S 25°05′42″E	Upload Photo
9/2/023/0033-053	14 Kort Street, Colesberg	Single storey with flat roof and light cornice along front and side facades. Asymmetrical five bay facade. Face-brick stoep with face-brick piers supporting pergola (traces of previous verandah). 6x6 double sliding sash windows with louvred shutters. Mod Type of site: House Current use: Residential : House. Intrinsic aesthetic/architectural merit	Colesberg	Colesberg	Register	30°43′16″S 25°05′41″E	Upload Photo
9/2/023/0033-054	2 D'Urban Row, Colesberg	House backs onto street. Single storey with hipped roof and narrower projecting wings under double pitched roofs with bargeboard gables. Symmetrical three bay facade between flanking wings. Lean-to extensions on sides. Ruled surrounds to opening and ruled Type of site: House Current use: Residential: House. Intrinsic aesthetic/architectural merit	Colesberg	Colesberg	Register	30°42′56″S 25°05′56″E	Upload Photo
9/2/023/0033-055	66 Church Street, Colesberg	Single storey with hipped roof, set back from street. Asymmetrical five bay facade. Projecting entrance porch. Raked joints. Face-brick stoep with pergola on plastered piers. Modern wooden casements. Modern door and sidelights. Good condition. Largely uno Type of site: House Current use: Residential: House. Intrinsic aesthetic/architectural merit	Colesberg	Colesberg	Register	30°43′00″S 25°05′59″E	Upload Photo
9/2/023/0033-056	3 Church Street, Colesberg	Single storey with hipped roof and central recessed triangular louvred ventilator dormer. Asymmetrical four bay facade with quoined edges and door surrounds. Raked joints. Low stoep with plastered walls. Ogee verandah on plastered piers. Evidence of woode Type of site: House Current use: Residential: Boarding House. Intrinsic aesthetic/architectural merit	Colesberg	Colesberg	Register	30°43′00″S 25°06′00″E	Upload Photo
9/2/023/0033-057	4–6 Ventershoek Street, Colesberg	Single storey with low pitched roof, hipped on right side, gabled on left. Asymmetrical eight bay facade. Edge pilasters and smooth opening surrounds. Pebbledash plaster. Low stoep with later pergola in plastered piers. 12x12 double sliding sash windows w Type of site: House Current use: Residential: House. Intrinsic aesthetic/architectural merit	Colesberg	Colesberg	Register	30°43′27″S 25°05′46″E	Upload Photo
9/2/023/0033-058	8 Ventershoek Street, Colesberg	Single storey with hipped roof. Asymmetrical four bay facade with garage under main roof to right. Low stoep with plastered wall. 6x6 double sliding sash windows with louvred shutters on projecting hinges. 4-panel door under 3-pane fanlight. Double leaf Type of site: House Current use: Residential: House. Intrinsic aesthetic/architectural merit	Colesberg	Colesberg	Register	30°43′30″S 25°05′47″E	Upload Photo
9/2/023/0033-059	5 Church Street, Colesberg	Single storey with flat roof and heavy cornice. Stepped side parapet with string course. Symmetrical five bay facade. Ruled joints and smooth edge pilasters Low stoep with facebrick wall. Ogee verandah on facebrick columns, partially glazed on left and r Type of site: House Current use: Residential: House. Intrinsic aesthetic/architectural merit	Colesberg	Colesberg	Register	30°43′00″S 25°05′59″E	Upload Photo
