= Richtersveld Local Municipality =

Richtersveld
- Local municipality
- Seal

- Location in the Northern Cape
- Coordinates: 28°45′S 17°00′E
- Country: South Africa
- Province: Northern Cape
- District: Namakwa
- Seat: Port Nolloth
- Wards: 6

Government
  - Type: Municipal council
  - Mayor: Richard Leon Ambrosini

Area
  - Total: 9,608 km^{2} (3,710 sq mi)

Population (2022)
  - Total: 24,235
  - Density: 2.522/km^{2} (6.533/sq mi)

Racial makeup (2022)
  - Black African: 14.6%
  - Coloured: 73.2%
  - Indian/Asian: 1.0%
  - White: 10.6%

First languages (2011)
  - Afrikaans: 87.0%
  - Xhosa: 6.1%
  - English: 2.6%
  - Other: 4.3%
- Time zone: UTC+2 (SAST)
- Municipal code: NC061

Richtersveld Municipality (Afrikaans: Richtersveld Munisipaliteit) is a local municipality within the Namakwa District Municipality, in the Northern Cape province of South Africa.

The municipality is named after Reverend W Richter, a Dutch missionary from the 20th century who opened a mission station in Kuboes.

== History ==
Richtersveld is part of Little Namaqualand, the part of Namaqualand south of the Orange River. The original inhabitants of Namaqualand were overwhelmingly Khoi Khoi, but also included some San people.

During the 19th century, other people started settling in Little Namaqualand. These included some white Trekboers, and also a number of so-called basters. Missionaries too started showing an interest in Little Namaqualand. The Rhenish Missionary Society established a mission station under the charge of Reverend Hein at Kuboes during the mid 19th century.

On 23 December 1847 the British Crown, through annexation, extended the northern boundary of the then Cape Province from the Buffels River up to the Orange River. From that date the whole of Little Namaqualand (including the Richtersveld) became subject to British rule.

In 1925 diamonds were discovered near Port Nolloth. In 1927 a particularly rich deposit was found at the mouth of the Orange River at Alexander Bay. Many people moved into the area. Throughout the 1960s to 1998, a Light Infantry Regiment of the SADF was garrisoned here along with 2 batteries of Self-Propelled Artillery

== Geography ==
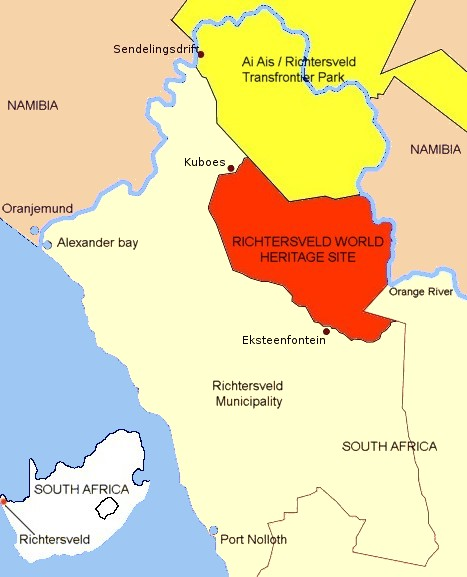
Map of the municipal area

The municipality covers an area of 9,608 square kilometres (3,710 sq mi) in the north-western corner of South Africa where the Atlantic coast meets the Orange River border with Namibia. It borders on the Nama Khoi Local Municipality to the south and east, Namibia's ǁKaras Region to the north, and the Atlantic Ocean to the west.

At the time of the 2011 census the municipality had a population of 11,982 in 3,543. The principal language was Afrikaans which is spoken by 87.0% of the population, followed by isiXhosa (spoken by 6.1%) and English (spoken by 2.6%). 76.6% of the population identified themselves as "Coloured", 13.1% as "Black African", and 8.5% as "White".

The principal town of the municipality is Port Nolloth (population 6,092 in 2011) which lies on the Atlantic coast in the southern part of the municipality. Other towns are Alexander Bay (pop. 1,736) at the mouth of the Orange River, and Sanddrif (pop. 1,854) which is adjacent to the Baken diamond mine. Other smaller settlements in the municipality include Sendelingsdrif (pop. 192) and Grootderm (pop. 80) along the Orange River, and Kuboes (pop. 948), Eksteenfontein (pop. 531) and Lekkersing (pop. 363) in the interior.

The northernmost part of the municipal area is part of the ǀAi-ǀAis/Richtersveld Transfrontier Park, while immediately to the south of the park is the Richtersveld Cultural and Botanical Landscape World Heritage Site.

The main transport route in the municipality is the R382 road which runs from Steinkopf (where it connects to the N7 highway) west to Port Nolloth, and then north along the coast to Alexander Bay.

== Politics ==
The municipal council consists of eleven members elected by mixed-member proportional representation. Six councillors are elected by first-past-the-post voting in six wards, while the remaining five are chosen from party lists so that the total number of party representatives is proportional to the number of votes received. In the election of 1 November 2021 the African National Congress (ANC) won a majority of six seats on the council. The following table shows the results of the election.

Richtersveld local election, 1 November 2021
Party	Votes				Seats		
Party	Ward	List	Total	%	Ward	List	Total
African National Congress	2,066	2,116	4,182	47.3%	6	0	6
Democratic Alliance	1,129	1,379	2,508	28.4%	0	3	3
Economic Freedom Fighters	324	329	653	7.4%	0	1	1
Independent candidates	522	–	522	5.9%	0	–	0
National Economic Fighters	143	293	436	4.9%	0	1	1
Namakwa Civic Movement	147	193	340	3.8%	0	0	0
Freedom Front Plus	108	94	202	2.3%	0	0	0
Total	4,439	4,404	8,843		6	5	11
Valid votes	4,439	4,404	8,843	99.1%			
Spoilt votes	46	32	78	0.9%			
Total votes cast	4,485	4,436	8,921				
Voter turnout	4,492						
Registered voters	7,420						
Turnout percentage	60.5%						
