= ALJ (disambiguation) =

ALJ is an administrative law judge in American administrative law.

ALJ or alj may also refer to:

- Alexander Bay Airport, Northern Cape, South Africa (IATA code "ALJ")
- Alangan language, Philippines (ISO 639-3 code "alj")
