= Baken =

Baken may refer to:

- Baken diamond mine, South Africa
- Baken Kydykeyeva, Kyrgyz actress

== See also ==
- Bakens
