= Lekkersing =

- Location within Northern Cape Location within South Africa
- Coordinates: 29.002°S 17.097°E
- Country: South Africa
- Province: Northern Cape
- District: Namakwa
- Municipality: Richtersveld

Area
  - Total: 0.63 km^{2} (0.24 sq mi)

Population (2011)
  - Total: 363
  - Density: 580/km^{2} (1,500/sq mi)

Racial makeup (2011)
  - Black African: 1.7%
  - Coloured: 97.5%
  - Indian/Asian: 0.6%
  - Other: 0.3%

First languages (2011)
  - Afrikaans: 98.9%
  - Other: 1.1%
- Time zone: UTC+2 (SAST)
- Postal code (street): 8283
- PO box: 8283

Lekkersing is a town in Namakwa District Municipality in the Northern Cape province of South Africa.

Lekkersing, located about 50 km from Eksteenfontein and 70 km from Kuboes, lies nestled in the hills of the Richtersveld. Temperatures as high as 53 °C have been recorded in this area.

No one can tell you with authority how Lekkersing (Afrikaans for ‘joyful singing’) got its name.
