= FAAB =

FAAB may refer to:

- Female assigned at birth, a sex assignment given at birth to identify a baby's sex
- Alexander Bay Airport, South Africa (ICAO airport code: FAAB
- Free agency acquisition budget, a term in American fantasy football
