= Sanddrif =

!Khays
- Location within Northern Cape Location within South Africa
- Coordinates: 28°25′38″S 16°46′38″E
- Country: Southern Africa
- Province: Namaqualand
- District: Namakwa
- Municipality: Richtersveld

Area
  - Total: 2.70 km^{2} (1.04 sq mi)

Population (2011)
  - Total: 1,854
  - Density: 687/km^{2} (1,780/sq mi)

Racial makeup (2011)
  - Black African: 17.4%
  - Coloured: 78.5%
  - Indian/Asian: 0.2%
  - White: 3.3%
  - Other: 0.6%

First languages (2011)
  - Afrikaans: 78.2%
  - Xhosa: 12.9%
  - English: 1.9%
  - Tswana: 1.1%
  - Other: 5.9%
- Time zone: UTC+2 (SAST)

Sanddrif is a town in Richtersveld Local Municipality in the Northern Cape province of South Africa, on the banks of the Orange River. It is located 57 km east of Alexander Bay.

Mining in the region began in the 1900s leading to the displacement of the indigenous Nama people. Diamond mines were again established in the 1970s, bringing a source of employment but also socio-economic upheaval, threatening the traditional Nama lifestyle. The subsequent migration of Xhosa people who came to the area to work in the mines led Sanddrif to acquire the nickname of "Rainbow Town". Sanddrif has nevertheless seen ethnic conflict between the indigenous Namas and the Xhosa migrants.

The Baken diamond mine, located outside Sanddrif, was opened by Trans Hex Group in May 2001.

Culture
