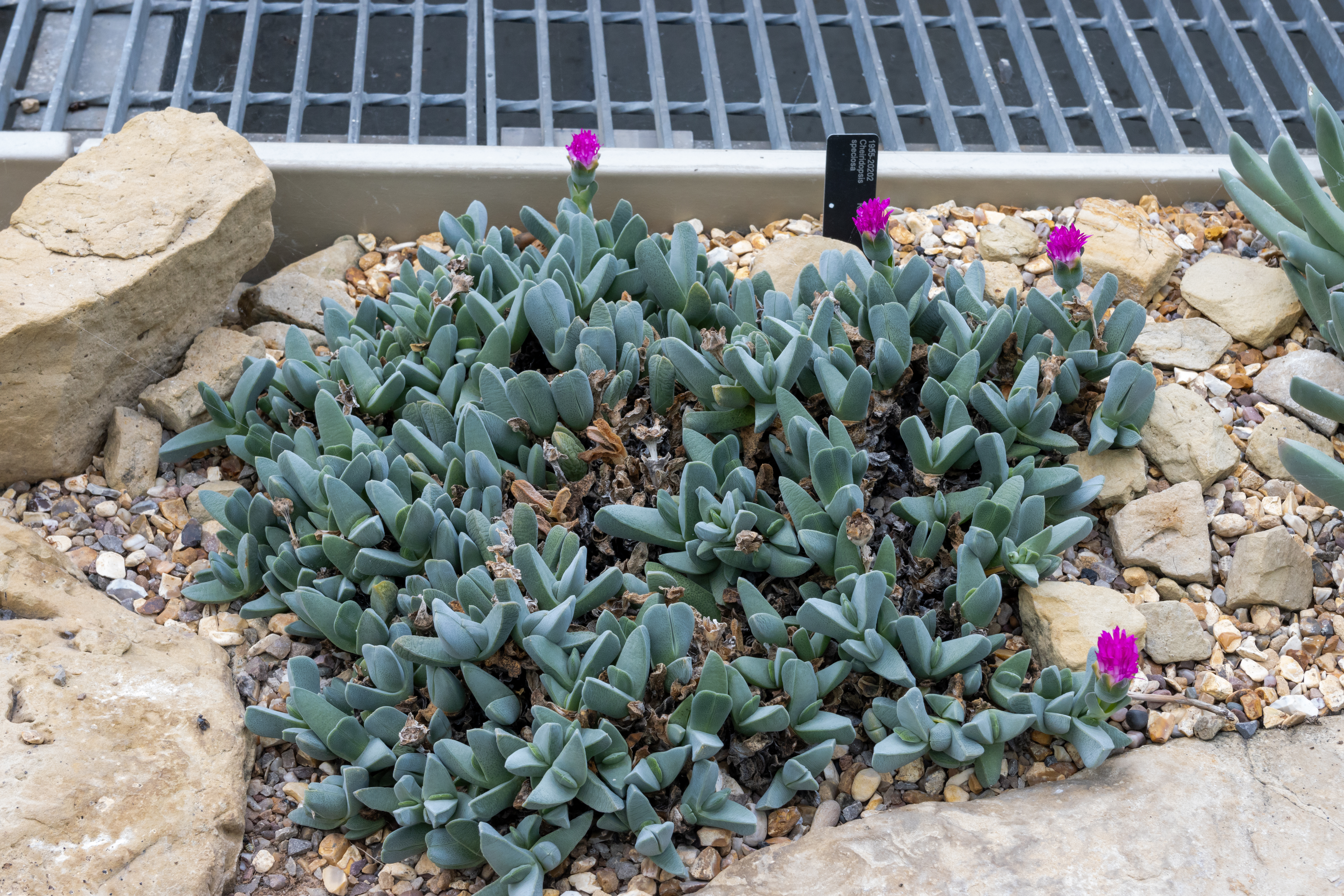

Scientific classification
- Kingdom: Plantae
- Clade: Tracheophytes
- Clade: Angiosperms
- Clade: Eudicots
- Order: Caryophyllales
- Family: Aizoaceae
- Genus: Cheiridopsis
- Species: C. speciosa

Binomial name
- Cheiridopsis speciosa L.Bolus

Synonyms
- Cheiridopsis comptonii L.Bolus; Cheiridopsis comptonii L.Bolus ex Jacobsen

= Cheiridopsis speciosa =

South African succulent species

Cheiridopsis speciosa is a species of plant from South Africa.

== Description ==
This succulent is a robust, clump-forming subshrub that grows up to 10 cm (3.9 in) tall with a diameter of up to 30 cm (12 in). The leaves are a pale grey-green in colour with crimped margins. They are lightly keeled and faintly spotted.

Flowers are present between August and September. As with the other species of the genus, the flowers are open during the day and closed at night. The flowers are solitary and with carmine to coppery petals. The centers may be magenta. They may also rarely be pure golden in colour. The anthers are pale yellow.

The fruit is 10-locular and cylindrical.

== Distribution and habitat ==
This species is endemic to the Northern Cape of South Africa, where it grows in the dry habitats found in Namaualand. It grows on quartzite outcrops and flats between Lekkersing, Vlakmyn and Spitskloof.

== Conservation ==
Cheiridopsis speciosa is considered to be of least concern by the South African National Biodiversity Institute.
