= Cheiridopsis umdausensis =

Scientific classification
- Kingdom: Plantae
- Clade: Tracheophytes
- Clade: Angiosperms
- Clade: Eudicots
- Order: Caryophyllales
- Family: Aizoaceae
- Genus: Cheiridopsis
- Species: C. umdausensis

Binomial name
- Cheiridopsis umdausensis L.Bolus

Species of plant

Cheiridopsis umdausensis is a species of succulent plant from South Africa.

== Description ==
This succulent subshrub form cushions that grow up to a height of 20 centimetres (7.9 in) with a diameter of 45 cm (18 in). The stout stems are chestnut brown in colour. the dark green leaves grow in parallel pairs and have a whitish sheen. They turn a dark maroon as summer approaches. They have a short, toothed keel and may have toothed margins. They are also covered in conspicuous white spots.

Flowers are present between August and September. They are yellow in colour and are solitarily borne. They form a spherical 10-locular fruit. The fruits are ruby red in colour when young.

This plant is similar to Cheiridopsis aspera but it is more compact with thicker and more coarsely toothed leaves. The flowers also have stouter stems and the fruits far larger closing bodies.

== Distribution and habitat ==
This species is endemic to the Northern Cape of South Africa. It has historically been lost, but it was rediscovered and is now known from a single hill northwest of Steinkopf. In 1990 this population consisted of about 200 plants. While it prefers hot quartzite slopes, it was found to be most common where plants could receive some shade from taller vegetation.

== Conservation ==
Cheiridopsis umdausensis is considered to be vulnerable by the South African National Biodiversity Institute. It is potentially at risk of overgrazing and being trampled on by goats at the only location it is currently known from.
