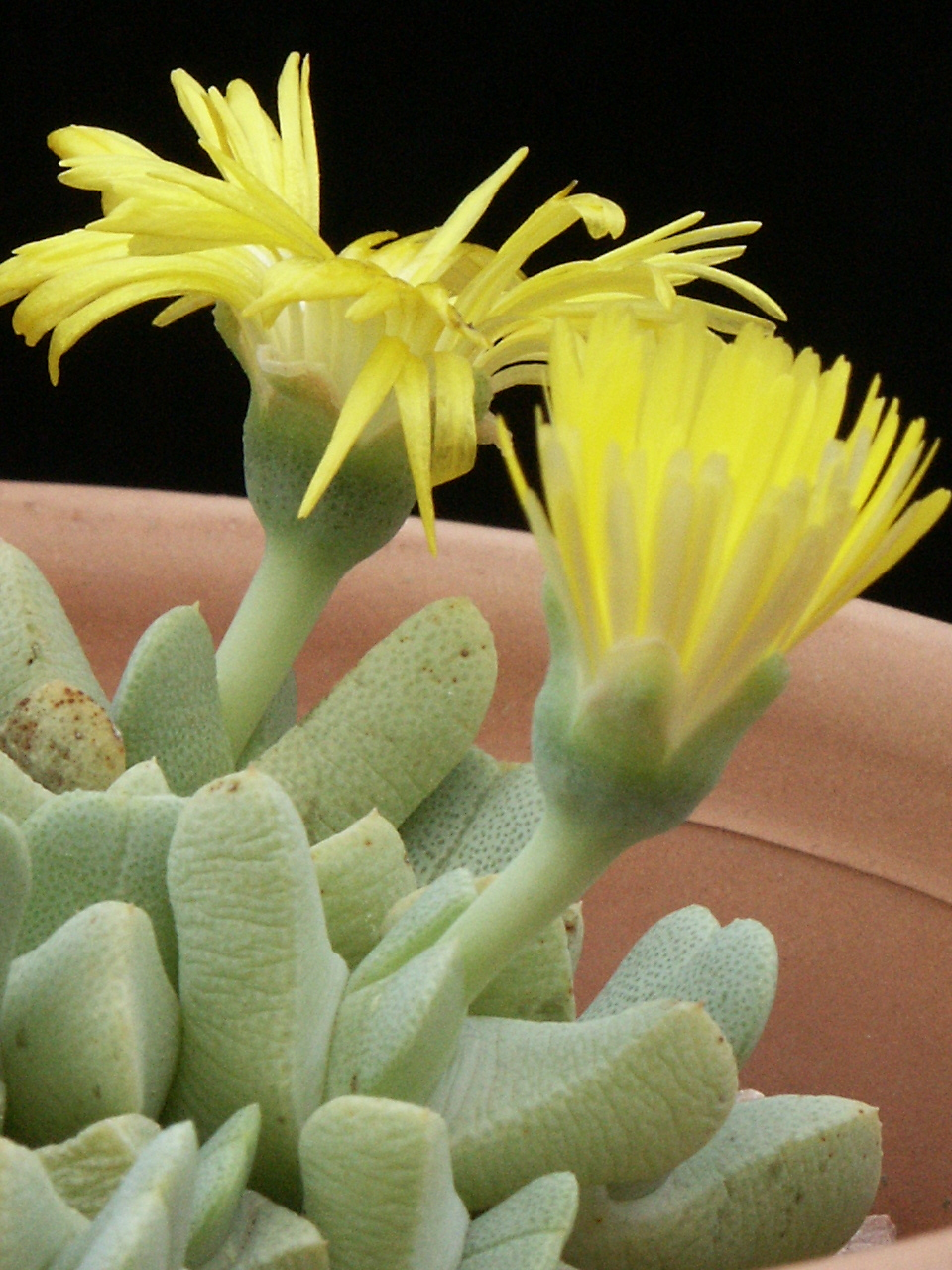
- In flower

Scientific classification
- Kingdom: Plantae
- Clade: Embryophytes
- Clade: Tracheophytes
- Clade: Angiosperms
- Clade: Eudicots
- Order: Caryophyllales
- Family: Aizoaceae
- Genus: Cheiridopsis
- Species: C. caroli-schmidtii

Binomial name
- Cheiridopsis caroli-schmidtii (Dinter & A.Berger) N.E.Br.

Synonyms
- Cheiridopsis ausensis L.Bolus; Cheiridopsis borealis L.Bolus; Mesembryanthemum caroli-schmidtii Dinter & A.Berger

= Cheiridopsis caroli-schmidtii =

Species of flowering plant

Cheiridopsis caroli-schmidtii is a species in the family Aizoaceae. Like the other members this species is native to semi-arid regions of Namibia and South Africa. This species grows on Granite and quartz outcrops.

== Name ==
The plant is named after Carl Schmidt who was a German nursery owner who operated in Erfurt. The genus name means hand shaped.

== Description ==
The daisy-like flowers illustrated open during the day from early winter to spring. Like many members of the genus the flower illustrated is borne singly and has Chrome-yellow petals which are 3.5 cm (1.4 in) in diameter. The clump of tri-angled leaves that makes up the plant has little or no stem. When fully grown they are over 5 cm (2.0 in) tall and about 17 cm (6.7 in) in diameter. During the summer the plant dries so much that it can be mistaken for dead.
