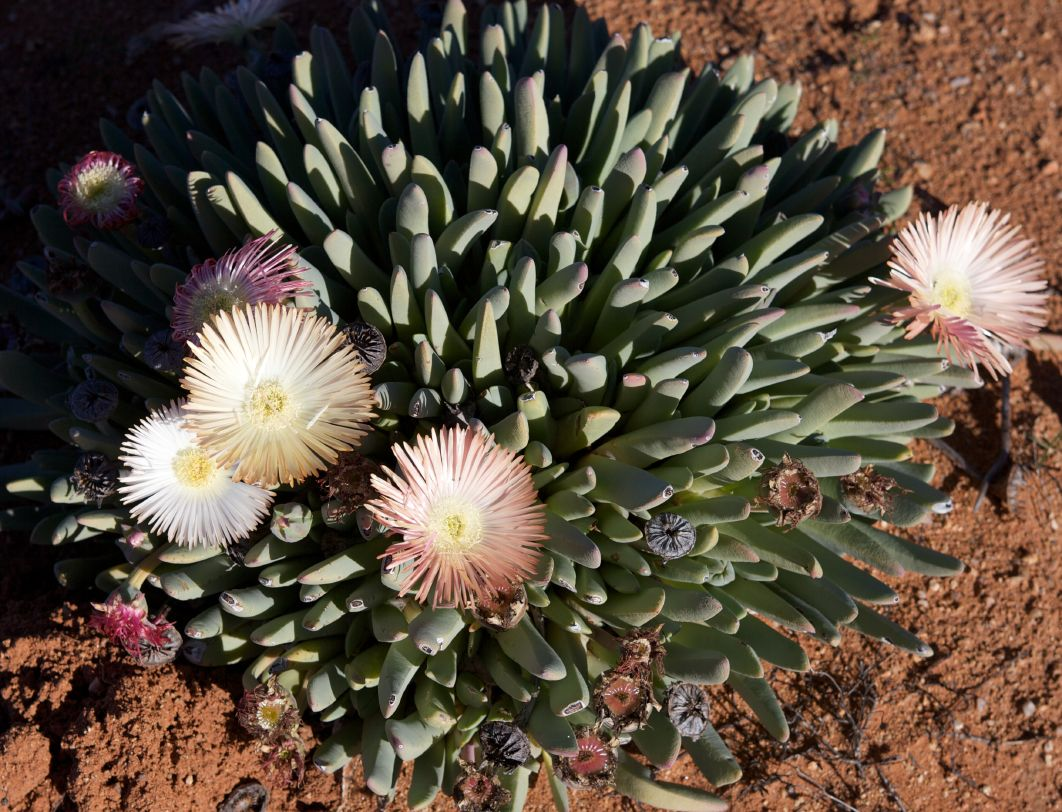
- Cheiridopsis denticulata

Scientific classification
- Kingdom: Plantae
- Clade: Tracheophytes
- Clade: Angiosperms
- Clade: Eudicots
- Order: Caryophyllales
- Family: Aizoaceae
- Subfamily: Ruschioideae
- Tribe: Ruschieae
- Genus: Cheiridopsis; N.E.Br. (1925)

Species
- See text

Synonyms
- Ihlenfeldtia H.E.K.Hartmann; Odontophorus N.E.Br.

= Cheiridopsis =

Genus of succulents

Cheiridopsis is a genus of flowering succulent perennial plants, with 41 species native to semi-arid regions of western Namibia and the Cape Provinces of South Africa. Some of the members of this genus, such as Cheiridopsis peculiaris, are critically endangered in habitat.

== Description ==
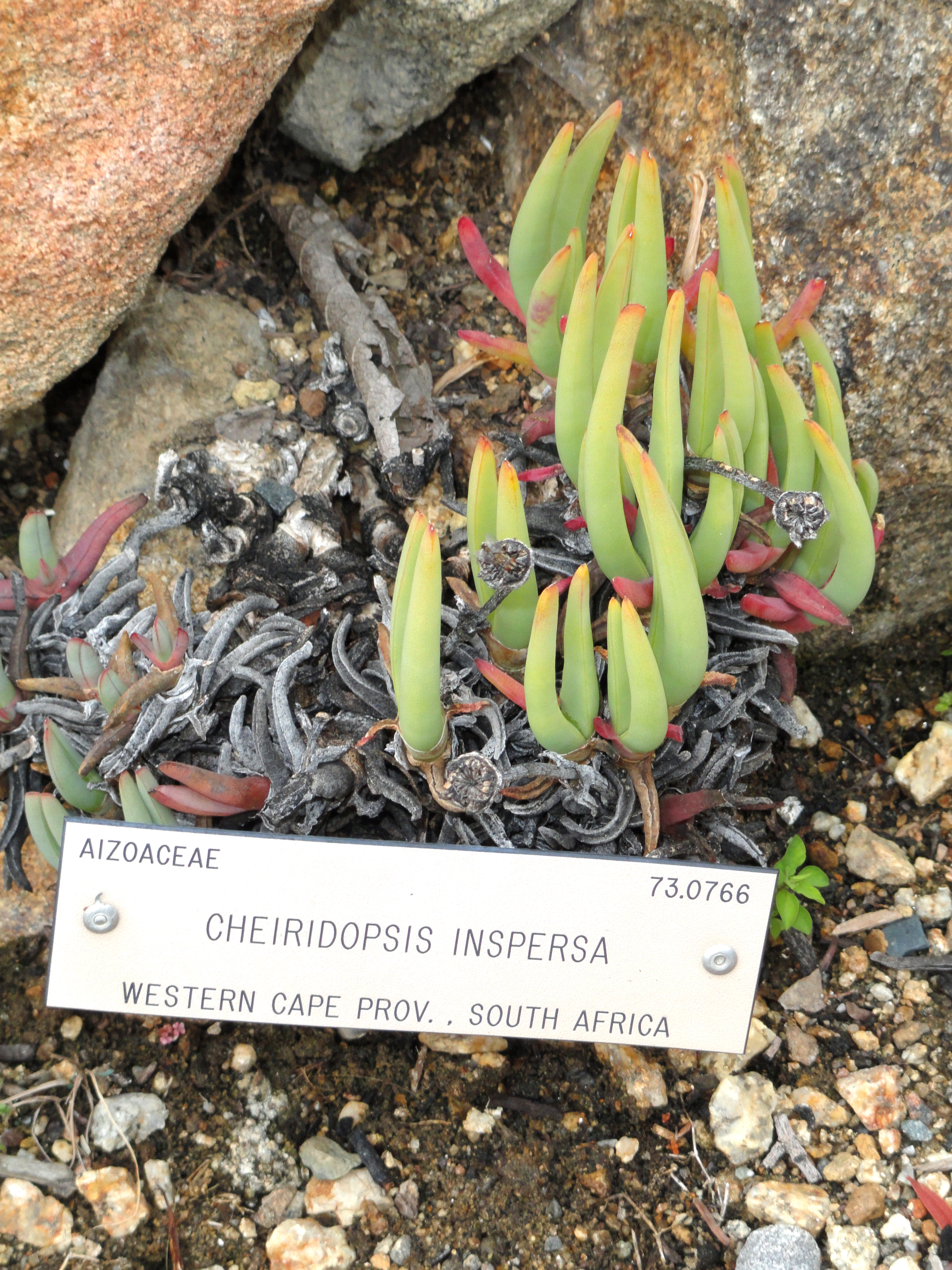
Cheiridopsis inspersa, synonym of C. rostrata

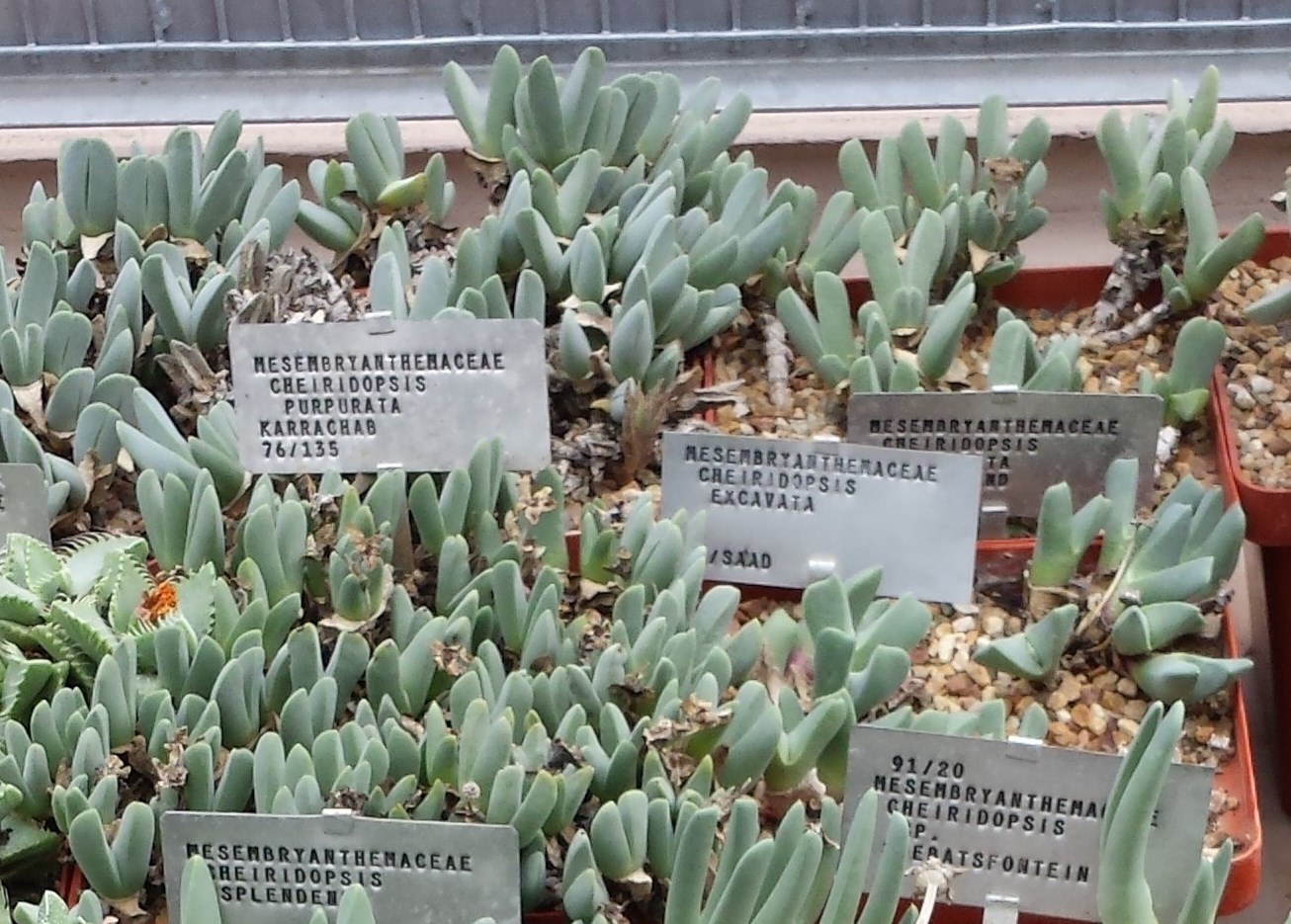
A selection of Cheiridopsis species in cultivation in South Africa.

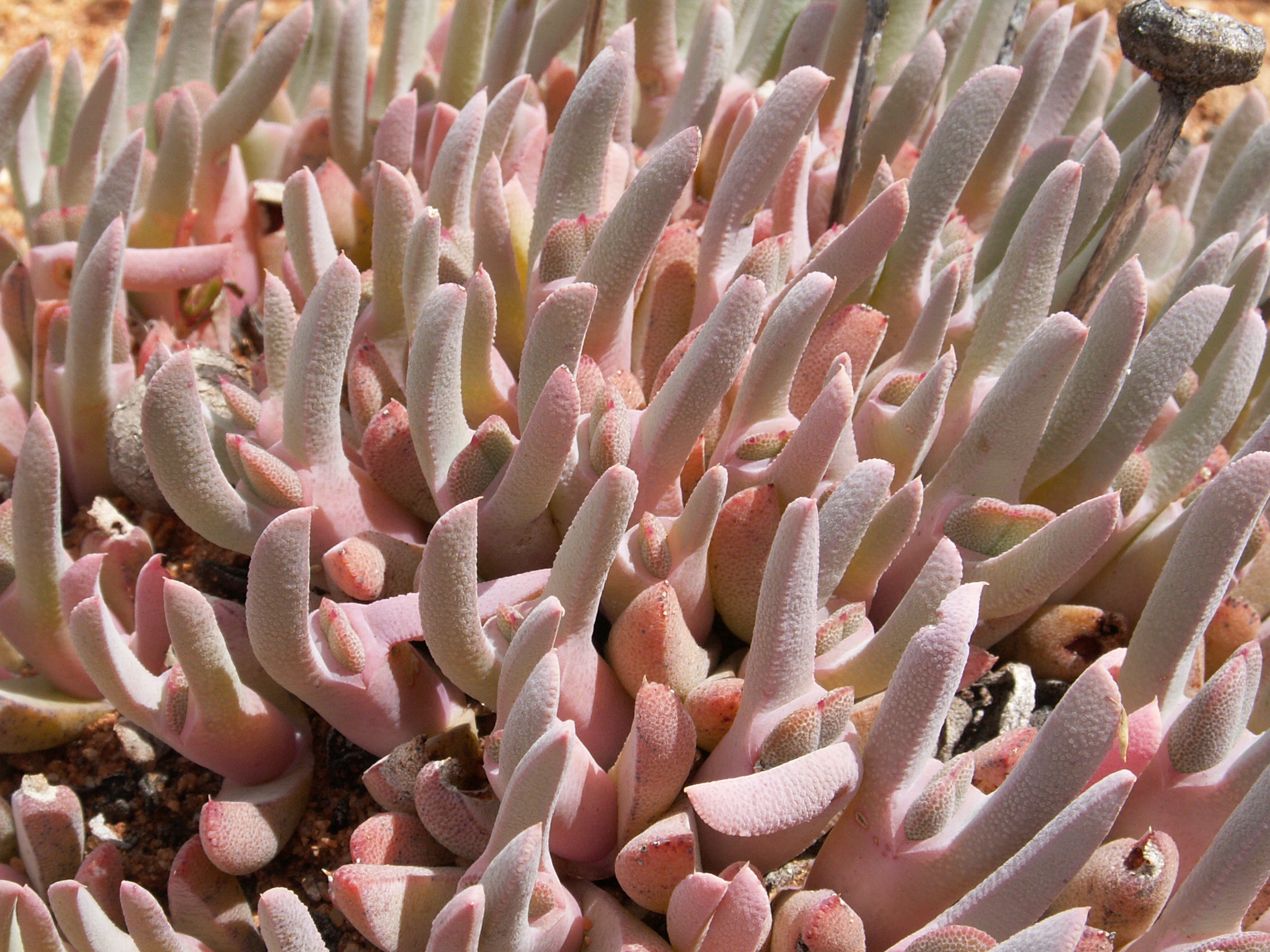
Cheiridopsis denticulata

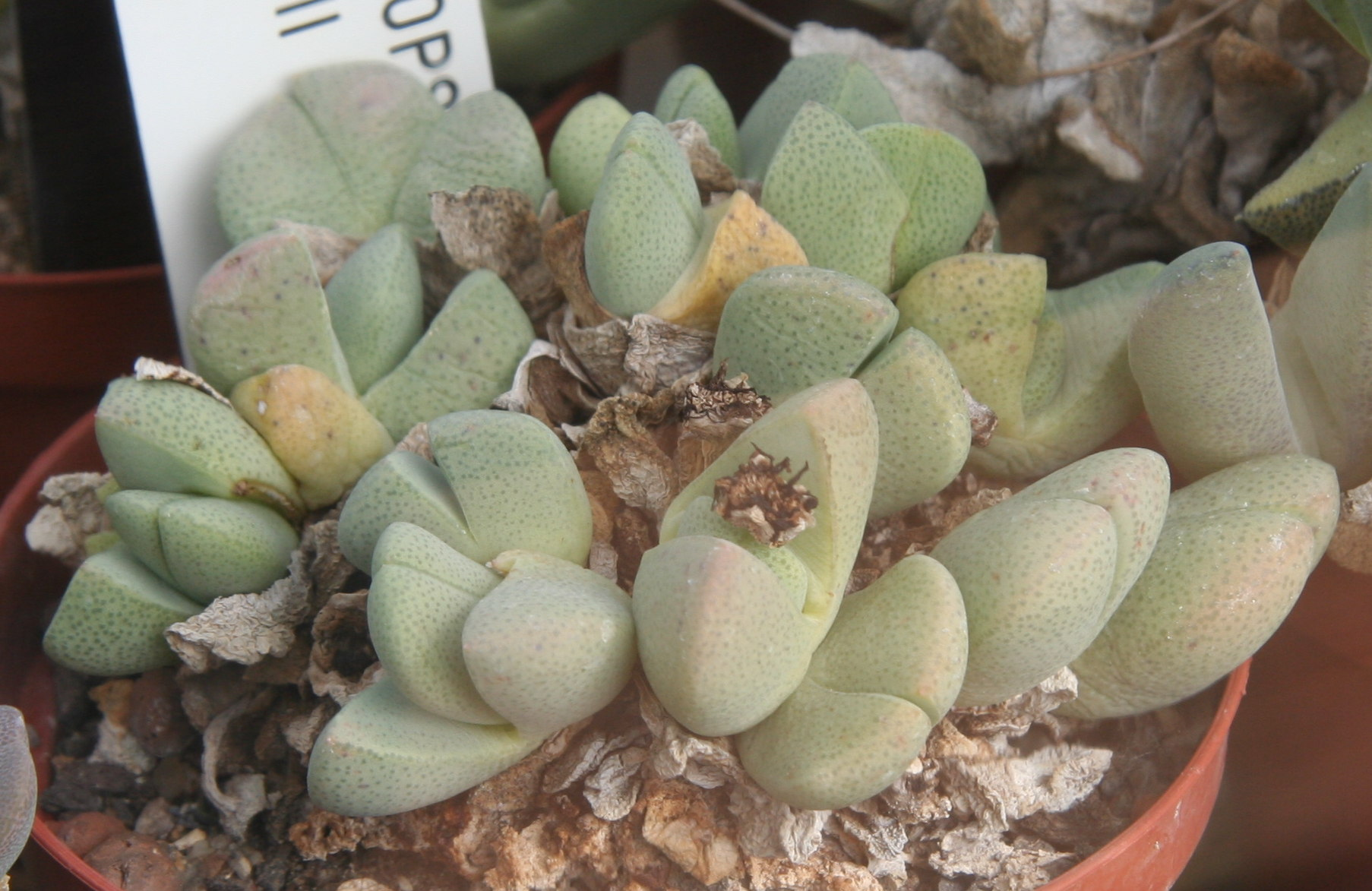
Cheiridopsis brownii

Most species are clump-forming, a few are shrubby. The leaves are opposite and triangular in section, rarely flattened, the surface more or less velvety, which makes them easy to distinguish from species of the allied genus Argyroderma. Daisy-like flowers open during the day in summer, are borne singly and usually have yellow, rarely purple or red, petals.

The name comes from the Greek "cheiris", meaning "sleeve". Each succeeding pair of leaves differs from the previous one in form, size, and relative unity of the leaves. Those most united wither in the resting period and form a papery sheath covering the succeeding pair of leaves during dormancy in dry, hot summer.

== Distribution ==
The genus occurs in the far west of South Africa and Namibia. Here it occurs from the Western Cape Province northwards through the Namaqualand, into Namibia.

== Cultivation ==
The species are mostly adapted to a very arid, winter-rainfall climate. The tender species C. peculiaris requires cultivation under glass in temperate regions.

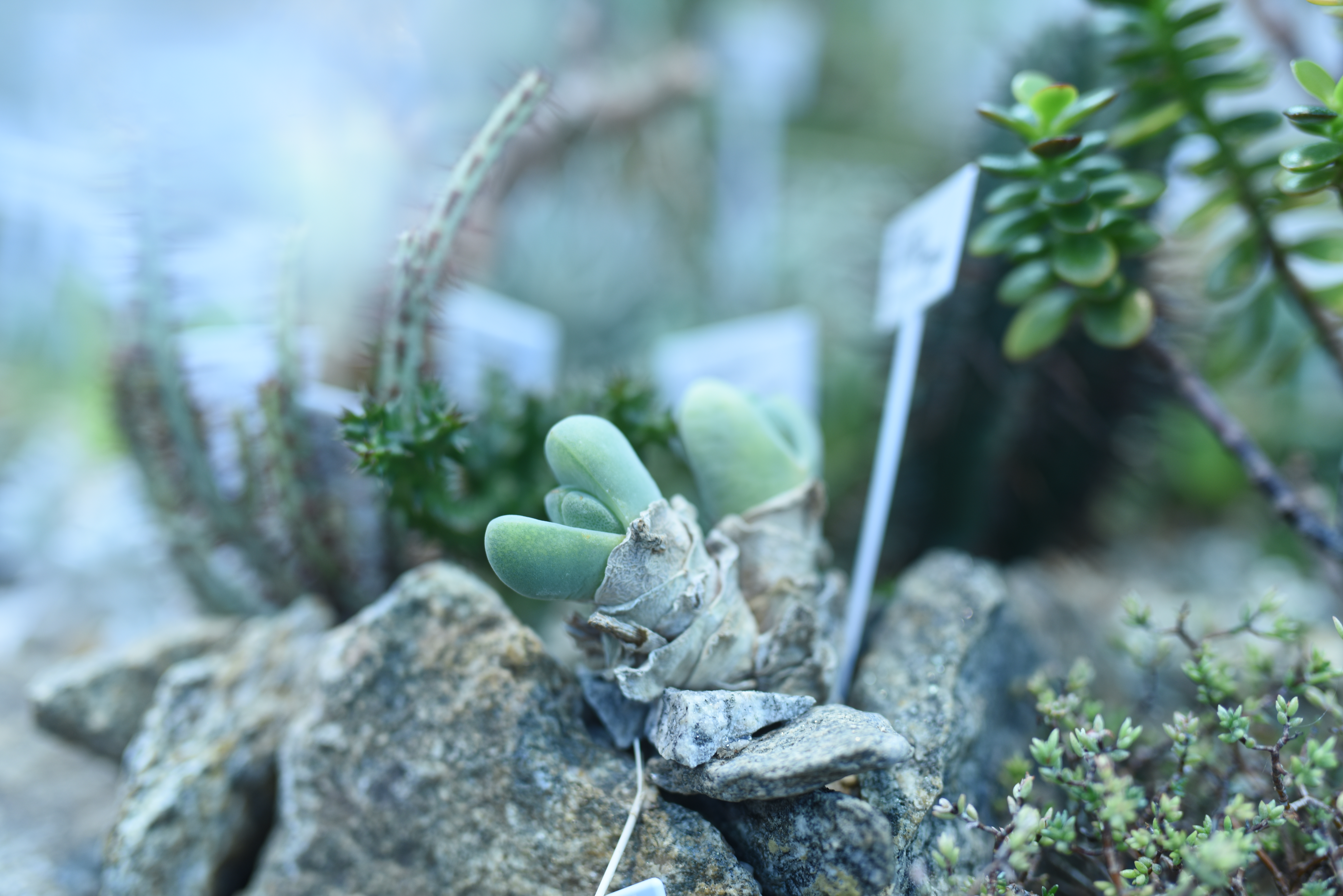
Cheiridopis pillansii

== Species ==
41 species are accepted.

- Cheiridopsis acuminata L.Bolus
- Cheiridopsis alba-oculata Klak & Helme
- Cheiridopsis amabilis S.A.Hammer
- Cheiridopsis angustifolia (L.Bolus) R.F.Powell
- Cheiridopsis aspera L.Bolus
- Cheiridopsis brownii Schick & Tischer
- Cheiridopsis campanulata G.Will.
- Cheiridopsis caroli-schmidtii (Dinter & A.Berger) N.E.Br.
- Cheiridopsis delphinoides S.A.Hammer
- Cheiridopsis denticulata (Haw.) N.E.Br.
- Cheiridopsis derenbergiana Schwantes
- Cheiridopsis excavata L.Bolus
- Cheiridopsis gamoepensis S.A.Hammer
- Cheiridopsis glomerata S.A.Hammer
- Cheiridopsis herrei L.Bolus
- Cheiridopsis imitans L.Bolus
- Cheiridopsis meyeri N.E.Br.
- Cheiridopsis minor (L.Bolus) H.E.K.Hartmann
- Cheiridopsis namaquensis (Sond.) H.E.K.Hartmann
- Cheiridopsis nana (L.Bolus) R.F.Powell
- Cheiridopsis nelii Schwantes
- Cheiridopsis pearsonii N.E.Br.
- Cheiridopsis peculiaris N.E.Br.
- Cheiridopsis pillansii L.Bolus
- Cheiridopsis pilosula L.Bolus
- Cheiridopsis ponderosa S.A.Hammer
- Cheiridopsis purpurea L.Bolus
- Cheiridopsis pusilla (S.A.Hammer) R.F.Powell
- Cheiridopsis robusta (Haw.) N.E.Br.
- Cheiridopsis rostrata (L.) N.E.Br.
- Cheiridopsis rudis L.Bolus
- Cheiridopsis schlechteri Tischer
- Cheiridopsis speciosa L.Bolus
- Cheiridopsis spiculata R.F.Powell
- Cheiridopsis turbinata L.Bolus
- Cheiridopsis umbrosa S.A.Hammer & Desmet
- Cheiridopsis umdausensis L.Bolus
- Cheiridopsis vanbredae L.Bolus
- Cheiridopsis vanzijlii L.Bolus
- Cheiridopsis velox S.A.Hammer
- Cheiridopsis verrucosa L.Bolus
