= Cheiridopsis pilosula =

Scientific classification
- Kingdom: Plantae
- Clade: Tracheophytes
- Clade: Angiosperms
- Clade: Eudicots
- Order: Caryophyllales
- Family: Aizoaceae
- Genus: Cheiridopsis
- Species: C. pilosula

Binomial name
- Cheiridopsis pilosula L.Bolus

South African succulent species

Cheiridopsis pilosula is a species of succulent plant from Namaqualand in the Northern Cape of South Africa.

== Description ==
This succulent subshrub becomes raggedly clumped and lank with age. It grows up to 15 cm (5.9 in) tall, with a diameter of 25 cm (9.8 in). The pale blue-grey leaves are slender and densely covered in hairs. They do not have teeth and are prominently keeled.

Flowers are preset in August and September. They are yellow in colour and are borne solitarily. While some populations have unicoloured petaloid staminodes, other populations have bi-coloured staminodes, in which the bottom third is white and the remaining two-thirds are yellow. The fruits are 10-locular and cylindrical below. They are covered in papillae, giving them a rough or velvety texture. The seeds are also covered in papilae.

== Distribution and habitat ==
Cheiridopsis pilosula is endemic to the Northern Cape of South Africa, where it grows on quartzite flats and slopes. It grows in the Richtersveld region, where it grows on the Stinkfontein Mountains and Klipbok.

== Conservation ==
This species is considered to be of least concern by the South African National Biodiversity Institute.
