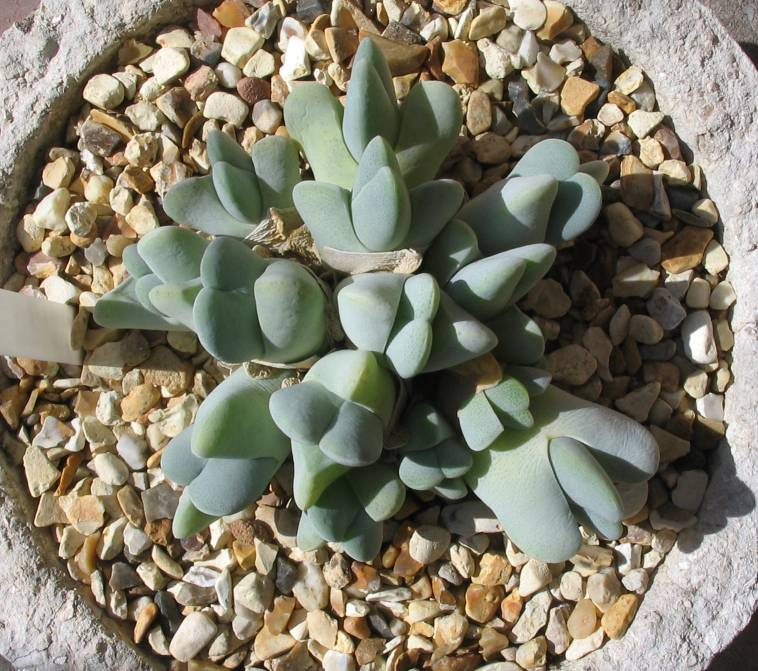
- Cheiridopsis pillansii in cultivation

Scientific classification
- Kingdom: Plantae
- Clade: Tracheophytes
- Clade: Angiosperms
- Clade: Eudicots
- Order: Caryophyllales
- Family: Aizoaceae
- Genus: Cheiridopsis
- Species: C. pillansii

Binomial name
- Cheiridopsis pillansii L.Bolus

Synonyms
- Cheiridopsis brachystigma L.Bolus; Cheiridopsis crassa L.Bolus; Cheiridopsis gibbosa Schick & Tischer; Cheiridopsis pillansii var. crassa (L.Bolus) Rowley

= Cheiridopsis pillansii =

Species of succulent

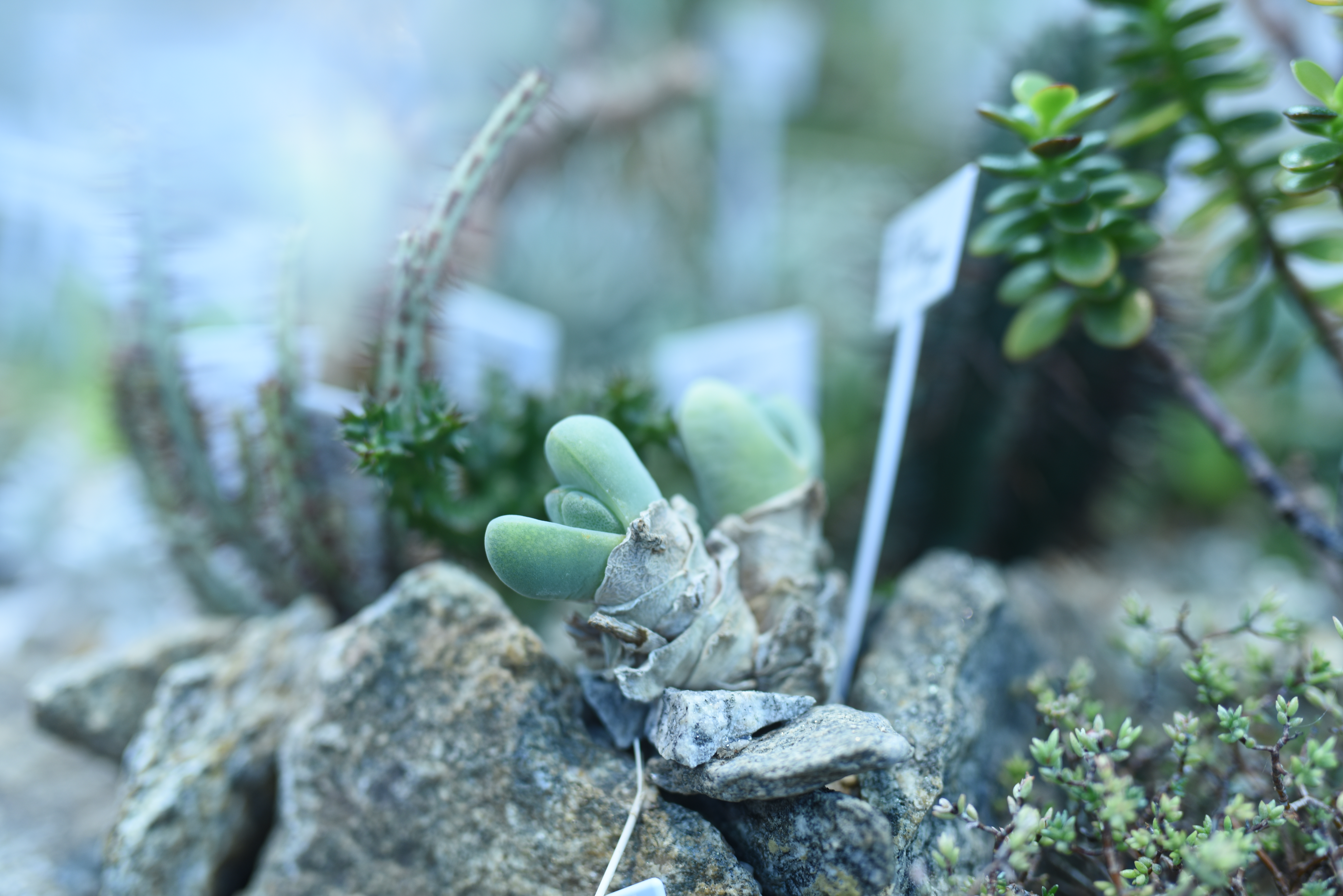
Aizoaceaeː Cheiridopis pillansii at Marsh Botanical Garden.

Cheiridopsis pillansii is a species of plant in the genus Cheiridopsis native to South Africa. It is a low-growing succulent with pairs of small, cushion-like leaves that are pale green to purple in color. C. pillansii, sometimes commonly called the "hoof mesemb", forms clumps up to 500 millimetres (20 in) wide.
