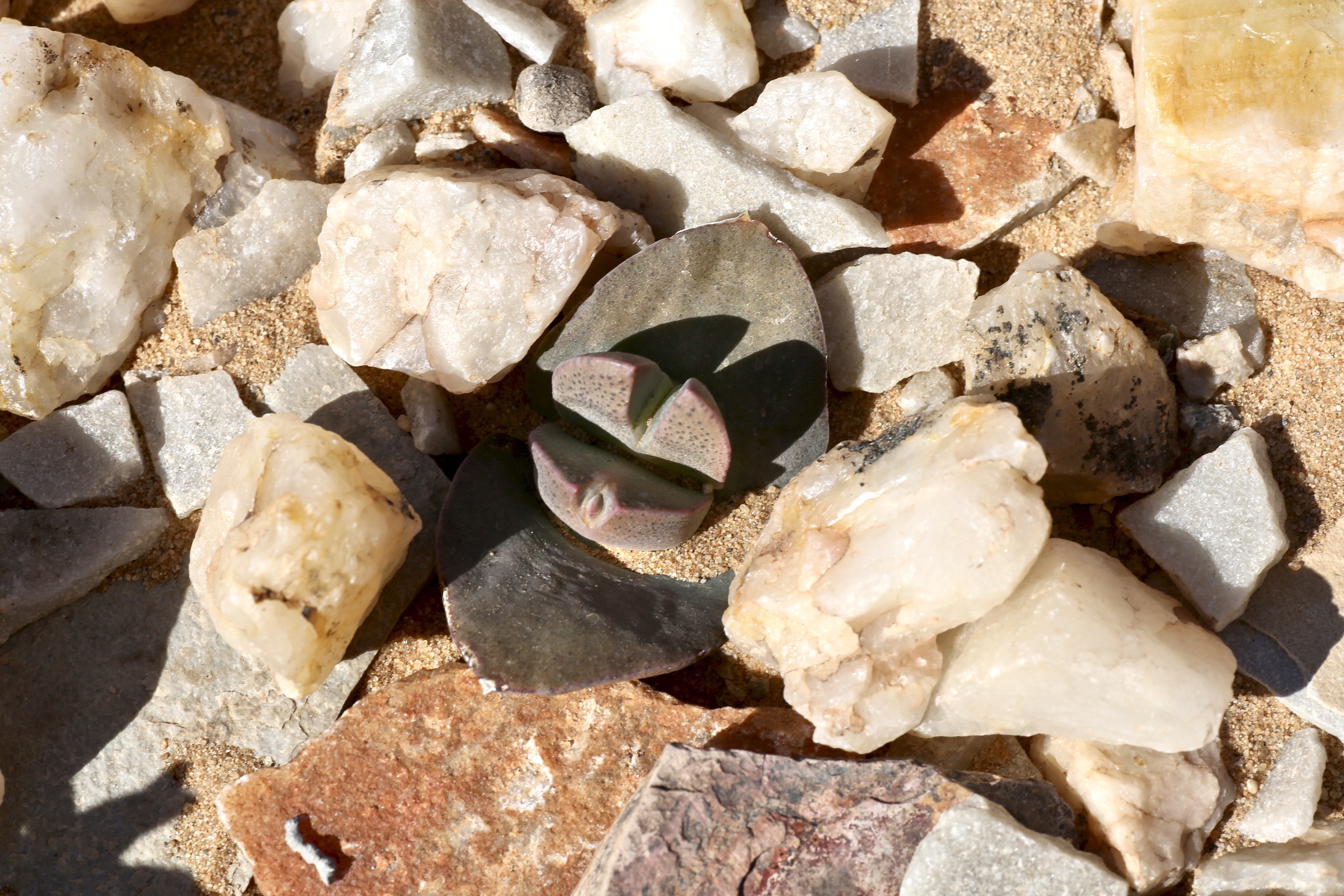

Conservation status
- Critically Endangered (IUCN 3.1)

Scientific classification
- Kingdom: Plantae
- Clade: Tracheophytes
- Clade: Angiosperms
- Clade: Eudicots
- Order: Caryophyllales
- Family: Aizoaceae
- Genus: Cheiridopsis
- Species: C. peculiaris

Binomial name
- Cheiridopsis peculiaris N.E.Br.

= Cheiridopsis peculiaris =

Species of plant

Cheiridopsis peculiaris is a critically endangered species of succulent plant in the family Aizoaceae native to South Africa. Its name refers to the peculiar leaf shape compared to other species in its genus. Like other Cheiridopsis it has leaf pairs, but unusually the outer pair grows flat along the ground while the other pair faces toward the sky.

== Description ==
This species is only known from a single population located in the Namaqualand shale shrubland within a 20 km^{2} area. This species typically grows on shale flats or on gneiss slopes. The plant is named for its peculiar habit of producing two alternating leaves that are completely different in appearance, one set which lays flat on the ground during the active growth period and a completely different set of resting leaves during the plant's dormant period which point upwards and enclose the next season's active growth leaves. As the plants mature, the flat, ground hugging leaves become more oval in shape and much larger and thicker, and take on a reddish coloration as camouflage, which allows the plant to blend into its environment. The plant produces yellow flowers during its autumn and winter growing period.

The plants go completely dormant in the summer months, and if grown in cultivation, will rot and die if they receive too much moisture during their summer dormancy period. Like most members of the genus Cheiridopsis, this species is not cold tolerant and must be protected from frost and freezing temperatures in cultivation. Only a few specific species, such as Cheiridopsis candidissima or Cheiridopsis herrei, can survive brief, light overnight frost down to 23 °F to 25 °F (-4 °C to -5 °C).

== Conservation ==
The range of this species is very limited and it is known from a single population that only occurs within a 20 km^{2} area. This population is imperiled due to infrastructure and road development, illegal collecting for the horticulture trade, and trampling and grazing by goats. Although this species is common in horticulture and reportedly easy to grow, it is in decline and is critically endangered in habitat with only approximately 1500 plants left in the wild as of 2021 based on field surveys and population estimates.
