= Ernest Oppenheimer Bridge =

Coordinates: 28.56531°S 16.50381°E

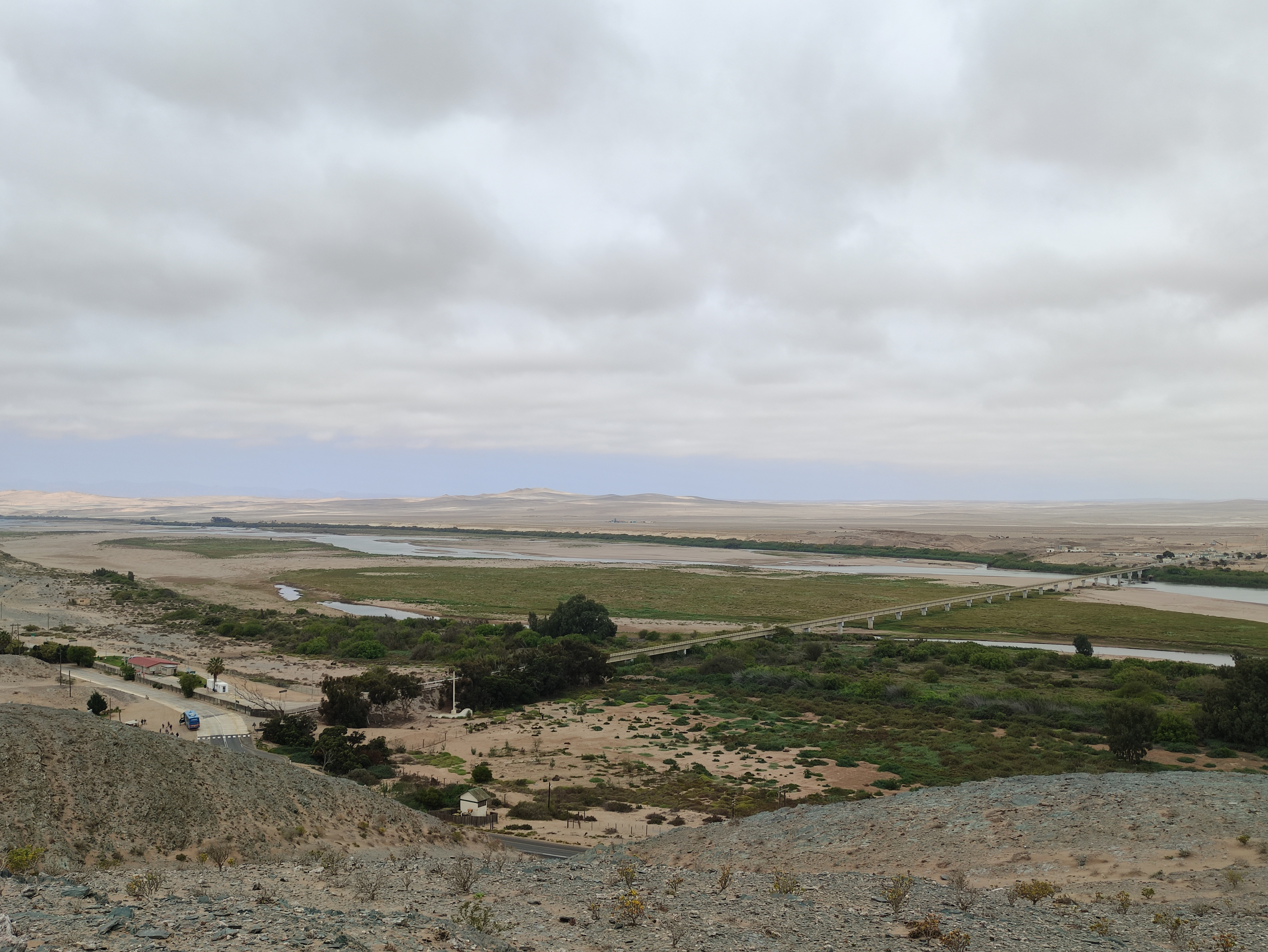
Bridge in 2022

The Ernest Oppenheimer Bridge, named for Ernest Oppenheimer, originally opened in 1951 and rebuilt in 1953, links the town of Oranjemund, Namibia, with the South African town of Alexander Bay, on the southern bank of the Orange River.

== See also ==
- List of international bridges
