= Cheiridopsis schlechteri =

Scientific classification
- Kingdom: Plantae
- Clade: Embryophytes
- Clade: Tracheophytes
- Clade: Spermatophytes
- Clade: Angiosperms
- Clade: Eudicots
- Order: Caryophyllales
- Family: Aizoaceae
- Genus: Cheiridopsis
- Species: C. schlechteri

Binomial name
- Cheiridopsis schlechteri Tischer

Synonyms
- Cheiridopsis johannis-winkleri Schwantes; Cheiridopsis paucifolia L.Bolus; Cheiridopsis pulverulenta L.Bolus

Species of plant

Cheiridopsis schlechteri is a species of plant from South Africa. It is a succulent plant that grows in dry habitats.

== Description ==
These plants grow as cushion-like clumps with a height of 3–8 cm (1.2–3.1 in) and diameter of 4–12 cm (1.6–4.7 in). The paired leaves are a dark grey-green in colour, particularly on the margins. They are also spotted with idioblasts. The leaves do not form resting sheaths, but shrivel and are held close to the plant when they are dormant.

This species shows much geographic variability. The plants north of Eenriet and Steinkopf have white leaves with long papillae, while those around Gamoep have darker green leaves, raised idioblasts, and thicker reddish margins. The population around Eenriet was initially classified as Cheiridopsis pulverulenta but many intermediate forms between this form and the more typical specimens have since been found. Plants on the Geelvlei plateau are particularly small, with diameters of less than 2 cm (0.79 in). While the bright conditions they grow in n this region stunts their growth, there may be a genetic component as even cultivated specimens remain this small.

Solitarily borne flowers are most common in mid-winter but are present into spring (between August and September). They range in colour from ivory (in Areb and Umduas) to lemon yellow (in Springbok) to a bright yellow-orange and are large relative to the size of the plant (diameter of 2–4 cm (0.79–1.57 in)). Some flowers may also show a faint pink blush.

While 10-locular fruit are most common, the fruit range between 9-12-locular.

== Distribution and habitat ==
This species is endemic to the Northern Cape of South Africa. It prefers dry habitats. It grows on gneiss slopes, or on quartzite, shale or calcrete flats between Eenriet, Umduas, Gamoep and Bushmanland.

== Conservation ==
Cheiridopsis schlechteri is considered to be of least concern by the South African National Biodiversity Institute.
