= Cheiridopsis turbinata =

Scientific classification
- Kingdom: Plantae
- Clade: Tracheophytes
- Clade: Angiosperms
- Clade: Eudicots
- Order: Caryophyllales
- Family: Aizoaceae
- Genus: Cheiridopsis
- Species: C. turbinata

Binomial name
- Cheiridopsis turbinata L.Bolus

Synonyms
- Cheiridopsis peersii L.Bolus; Cheiridopsis turbinata var. minor L.Bolus; Cheiridopsis turbinata var. turbinata

South African succulent species

Cheiridopsis turbinata is a succulent plant from South Africa.

== Description ==
Cheiridopsis turbinata is a succulent which forms a robust, essentially stemless cushion. It grows to a height of 5–12 cm (2.0–4.7 in), with a diameter of 5–30 cm (2.0–11.8 in). The paired leaves are a dull, deep green and are sharply keeled.

Flowers are solitarily borne and are present in August and September. They are large with yellow petals. The fruits are 10-14-locular.

== Distribution and habitat ==
This species is endemic to the Northern Cape and Western Cape of South Africa. It grows on shale flats and gneiss outcrops between Geelvlei, Steinkopf (and further north) and Springbok.

== Conservation ==
This species is classified as being of least concern by the South African National Biodiversity Institute.
