= Cheiridopsis velox =

Scientific classification
- Kingdom: Plantae
- Clade: Tracheophytes
- Clade: Angiosperms
- Clade: Eudicots
- Order: Caryophyllales
- Family: Aizoaceae
- Genus: Cheiridopsis
- Species: C. velox

Binomial name
- Cheiridopsis velox S.A.Hammer

South African succulent species

Cheiridopsis velox is a species of succulent plant from South Africa.

== Description ==
Cheiridopsis velox is a tangled succulent shrublet that grows to a height of 25 cm (9.8 in) and a diameter of 40 cm (16 in). The internodes are up to 5 mm (0.20 in) long. Each branch bears between six and ten pairs of live triangular green leaves. They are about 25 mm (0.98 in) long with a mild keel, whitish papillae and faint spots which are more or less continuous along the margins. They have sparse teeth near the tips which grow to a length of up to 2 mm (0.079 in) and end in short, brown bristles. The old leaves remain on the branch and are pale brown in colour.

Flowers are present between late winter and mid spring, although they are most common in August and September. Each solitary flower is surrounded by leaf-like bracts. They are lightly scented, and they open during the day and close at night. About 90-100 petals are present in two or three rows. They grow to a length of 14 mm (0.55 in) and are lemon yellow at the tip, fading to white at the base. They have five reddish sepals, three of which have translucent margins. They all bear a brown apical bristle. Each flower has about 18 stamens. The lemon yellow filaments are 5–8 mm (0.20–0.31 in) long with dark yellow anthers. The dark green gynoecium has a diameter of 6–8 mm (0.24–0.31 in) and has about 60 divisions. It is covered in granular idioblasts. There are eight to ten greenish stigmas. They are 2 mm (0.079 in) long and covered in papillae.

The fruits are 8-10-locular, although 10-locular fruits are most common. They are 6–8 mm (0.24–0.31 in) long. The fruits are plum red when young, becoming pale or dark brown over time. They are slightly convex above and rounded and papillate (covered in papillae) below. They do not have valve wings. The chestnut brown seeds are pear shaped and 0.65 mm (0.026 in) long.

== Distribution and habitat ==
This species is endemic to the Northern Cape of South Africa, where it is known from two localities. It grows in mountainous areas in the Richtersveld region, where is prefers quartzite plateaus. It grows on Ploegberg and Vandersterrberg.

== Conservation ==
The South African National Biodiversity Institute has classified Cheiridopsis velox as vulnerable. While it is not currently at risk of being trampled, it may be in the future as vegetation on lower slopes and nearer to settlements is used up by livestock, forcing them into the areas where this plant grows in search of food.
