= Cheiridopsis umbrosa =

Scientific classification
- Kingdom: Plantae
- Clade: Tracheophytes
- Clade: Angiosperms
- Clade: Eudicots
- Order: Caryophyllales
- Family: Aizoaceae
- Genus: Cheiridopsis
- Species: C. umbrosa

Binomial name
- Cheiridopsis umbrosa S.A.Hammer & Desmet

Species of succulent plant

Cheiridopsis umbrosa is a succulent plant from South Africa.

== Description ==
This succulent subshrub becomes loosely clumped with age. It grows to be 3–8 cm (1.2–3.1 in) tall, with a diameter of 5–8 cm (2.0–3.1 in). The leaves are a pale greenish grey, but they start to tuen red by early summer and eventually die off, regrowing in the next rainy season.

Long-stalked solitary flowers are present in August and September. They are yellow in colour and produce a 10-locular fruit.

== Distribution and habitat ==
This species is endemic to the Northern Cape of South Africa from Khurisberg to the east of Concordia. It is most frequently found growing on damp, shaded gneiss crevices, although it can also rarely be found growing on exposed quartzite.

== Conservation ==
Cheiridopsis umbrosa is considered to be of least concern by the South African National Biodiversity Institute.
