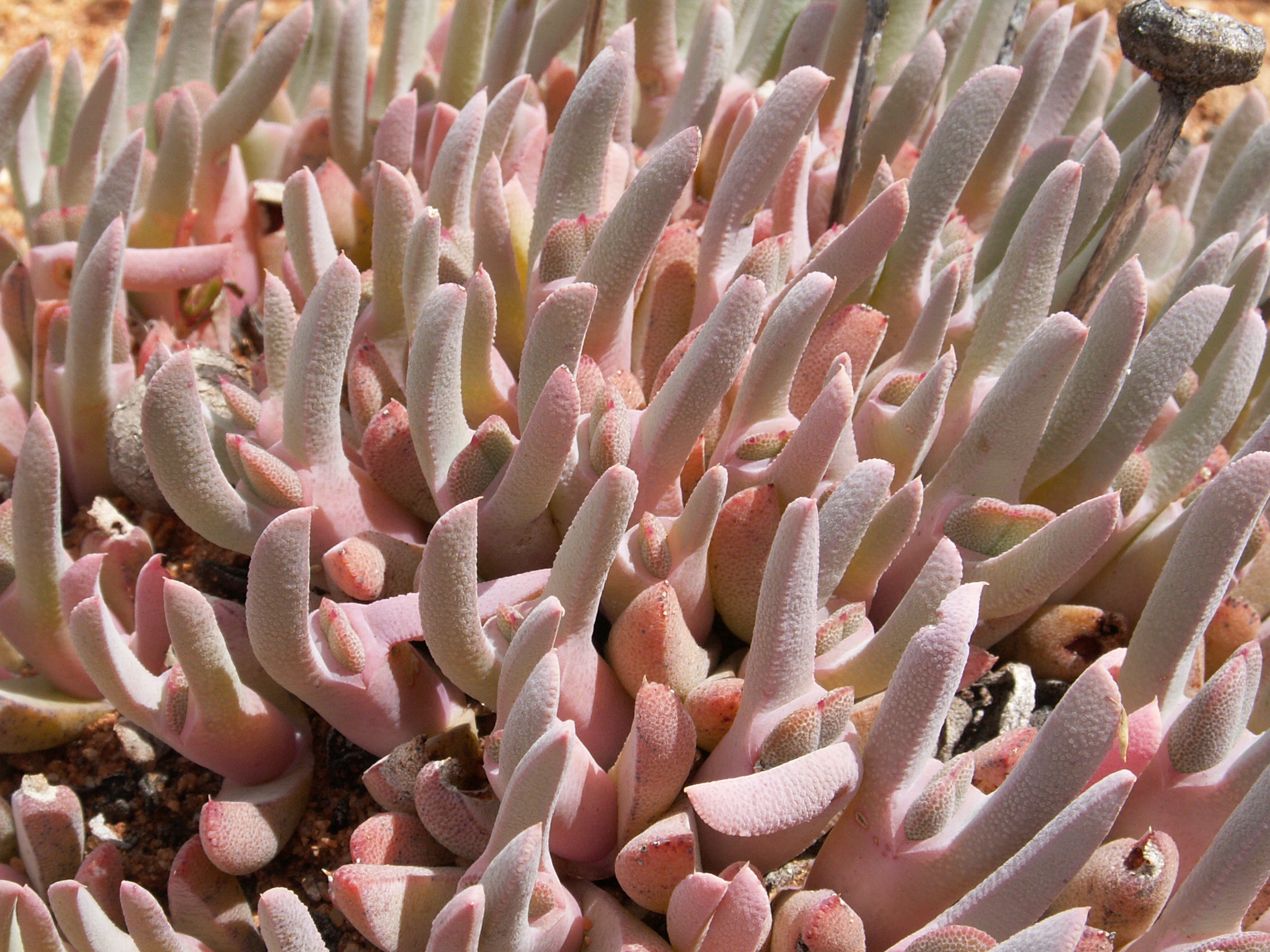
- C. denticulata growing in Richtersveld National Park

Scientific classification
- Kingdom: Plantae
- Clade: Tracheophytes
- Clade: Angiosperms
- Clade: Eudicots
- Order: Caryophyllales
- Family: Aizoaceae
- Genus: Cheiridopsis
- Species: C. denticulata

Binomial name
- Cheiridopsis denticulata (Haw.) N.E.Br.

= Cheiridopsis denticulata =

Species of succulent

Cheiridopsis denticulata is a species in the genus Cheiridopsis native to South Africa. It has yellow flowers, and distinctive foliage with a narrow, upward curving shape. Commonly called "pink fingers" (pienkvingers in Afrikaans), the leaves grow in opposite pairs and are light blue with sun exposure blushing them shades of pink and purple.
