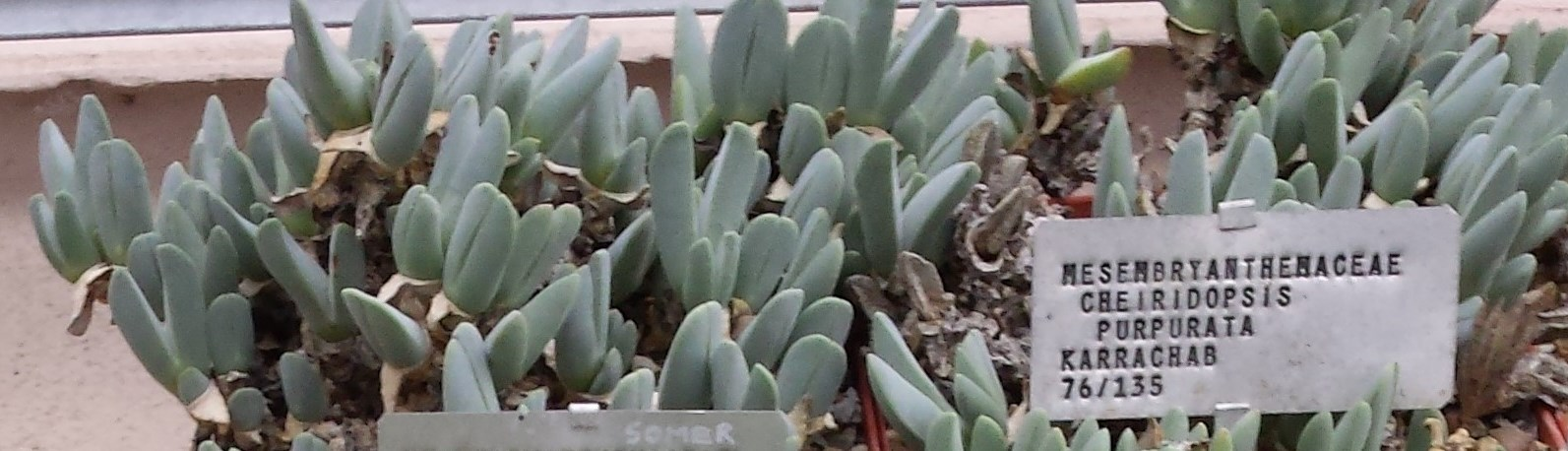

Scientific classification
- Kingdom: Plantae
- Clade: Tracheophytes
- Clade: Angiosperms
- Clade: Eudicots
- Order: Caryophyllales
- Family: Aizoaceae
- Genus: Cheiridopsis
- Species: C. purpurea

Binomial name
- Cheiridopsis purpurea L.Bolus

Synonyms
- Cheiridopsis purpurata L.Bolus; Cheiridopsis splendens L.Bolus

= Cheiridopsis purpurea =

South African succulent species

Cheiridopsis purpurea is a species of succulent plant from South Africa. It is found growing in the succulent Karoo vegetation type.

== Description ==
This small and robus clump-forming succulent grows 8–12 cm (3.1–4.7 in) tall with a diameter of up to 40 cm (16 in). It often becomes raggedy with age. The triangular leaves are paired, with both leaves in each pair being about the same size (3–5 cm (1.2–2.0 in) long). Cultivated specimens may have three pairs of leaves per branch, while those in the wild have one or two pairs per branch. The leaves are fused when young, separating as they mature. They are grey-green in colour with slightly crimped margins and are spotted with transparent dots. They have a keel, which may or may not have teeth. The old leaves form persistent corky brown sheaths that protect new growth when they dry out and die.

Flowers are present between June and September. They are open between midday and sunset, closing for the night and morning. They have a diameter of about 4 cm (1.6 in) and are a bright magenta in colour. This species differs from others in this genus in that the petals do not fully unfold, but hide the stamens and feather stigmas. The anthers are grey.

This plant forms a cylindrical 10-locular fruit. They have stiff bristles at the tips of the expanding keels.

== Distribution and habitat ==
This species is endemic to the Northern Cape of South Africa. It has a range of less than 500 km^{2} (190 sq mi) between Karrachab and Maerfontein in the Richtersveld region. It is found growing in crevices in quartzite bands in sandstone areas.

== History and etymology ==
This species was first described in 1931 by Harriet Margaret Louisa Bolus. The scientific name refers to the colour of the flowers.

== Ecology ==
This plant is pollinated by insects.

The capsules open when wet, releasing only a few seeds at a time. This ensures that seeds are still available should conditions be more favourable further down the line. This complex capsule is important in light of the relatively short lifespan of this species. It is beneficial to set seed whenever conditions may be suitable for new growth, while still holding out for times when conditions make it more likely that young plants survive.

== Conservation ==
While this species is not currently threatened, it is considered to be rare by the South African National Biodiversity Institute due as it is a habitat specialist and has a small range. The combination of these two factors mean that it is not a common species, even if it is not yet uncommon enough or threatened enough to be considered at risk of extinction.
