= Cheiridopsis ponderosa =

Scientific classification
- Kingdom: Plantae
- Clade: Tracheophytes
- Clade: Angiosperms
- Clade: Eudicots
- Order: Caryophyllales
- Family: Aizoaceae
- Genus: Cheiridopsis
- Species: C. ponderosa

Binomial name
- Cheiridopsis ponderosa S.A.Hammer

South African succulent species

Cheiridopsis ponderosa is a species of succulent plant from South Africa.

== Description ==
This succulent subshrub grows to a height of 15 cm (5.9 in) with a diameter of 25 cm (9.8 in). Plants become densely clumped and sort stemmed with age. Thick and densely papillate leaves grow in pairs. The leaves in each pair grow relatively close together. They are grey green in colour, with a rounded keel and may have minute teeth near the tip. The leaf margins are translucent.

Cup-shaped flowers are present in August and September. They are large and solitarily borne. The petals are yellow in colour. The fruits are 10-locular and have a velvety texture. They are spherical below.

== Distribution and habitat ==
Cheiridopsis ponderosa is endemic to the Northern Cape of South Africa. It grows on quartzite slopes and flats in the lower Richtersveld region, where it has been found growing on Skimmelberg, near Grasvlakte.

== Conservation ==
This species is considered to be of least concern by the South African National Biodiversity Institute.
