= Oranjemund =

- Town
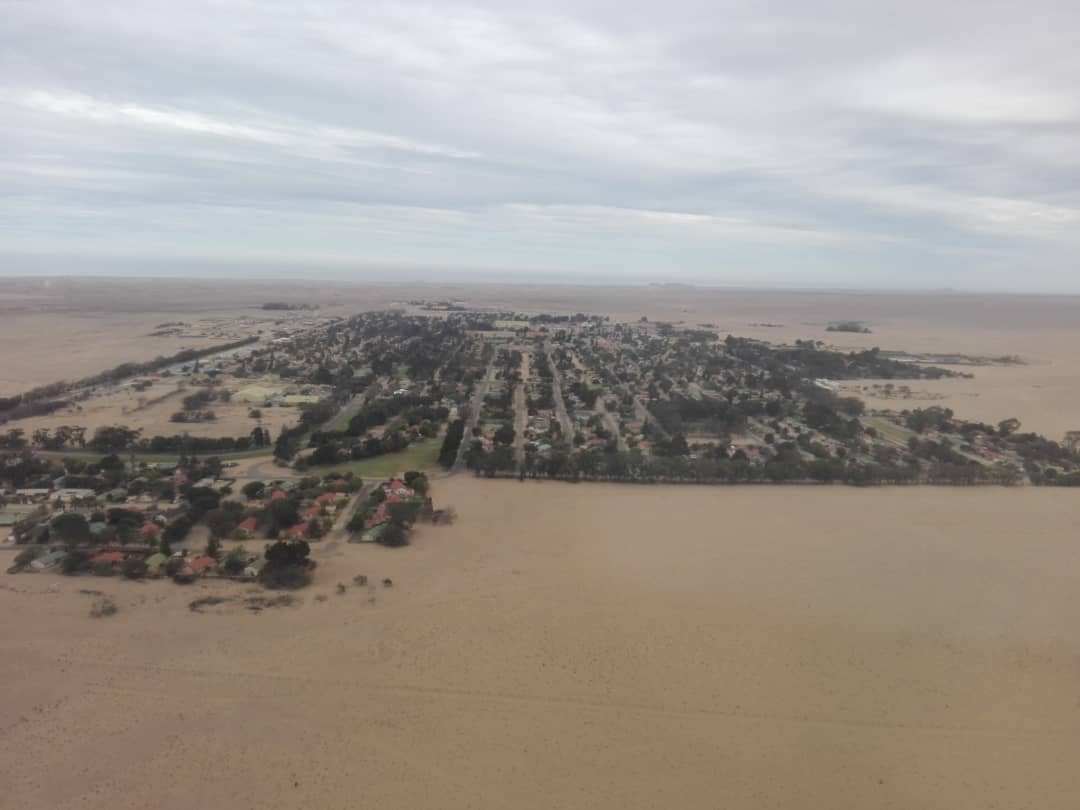

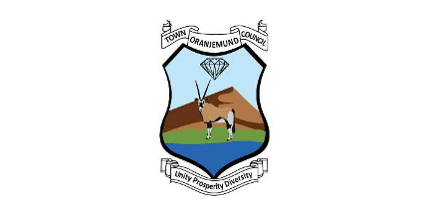
- Flag
- Nickname: O – Mund
- Motto: Excellence Integrity Teamwork Diversity
- Location in Namibia
- Coordinates: 28°33′6″S 16°25′35″E
- Country: Namibia
- Region: ǁKaras Region
- Constituency: Oranjemund Constituency
- Settled: 1936

Government
  - Mayor: Henry Edward Coetzee (SWAPO)
- Elevation: 39 ft (12 m)

Population (2023)
  - Total: 7,736
- Time zone: UTC+2 (South African Standard Time)
- Climate: BWk

Oranjemund (German for "Mouth of Orange") is a diamond mining town in the ǁKaras Region of the extreme southwest of Namibia, on the northern bank of the Orange River mouth at the border with South Africa. It had a population of 7,736 people in 2023.

== History ==
The entire area along the shore of the Atlantic Ocean was proclaimed restricted (the Sperrgebiet) in 1908 due to the occurrence of alluvial diamonds. Since then, the public has been forbidden entry into the area. In 1927 diamonds were found south of the Orange River in South Africa. Hans Merensky and other prospectors assumed that the shoreline north of the Orange river mouth in Namibian territory would also have diamonds. A year later they conducted an expedition from Lüderitz 300 kilometres (190 mi) south to the mouth of the Orange River, where they found rich deposits on the north side of the river and the adjacent coastline and established a tented camp from which Oranjemund developed.

Due to the Great Depression, diamond mining was not undertaken until 1935; a year later, workers' houses were erected. Oranjemund as a formal settlement was thus established in 1936. Production of mainly gem-quality diamonds has remained at approximately 400 kg (2,000,000 carats) per year, mainly through improvements in technology.

Oranjemund was proclaimed a town in 2011. Until 2017 the town was run by Namdeb (formerly Consolidated Diamond Mines), now a subsidiary of De Beers. Access to, and settlement in Oranjemund was restricted to employees and their relatives. The infrastructure is superior to that of other towns in Namibia's South, due to it not being dependent on cost recovery from its inhabitants. In the second half of the 20th century, Oranjemund featured a large recreational complex with swimming pool, cinema, restaurants and bars. Water is still provided free of charge, and until 2016, so was electricity.

== Economy and infrastructure ==
Oranjemund is still dominated by its diamond mining industry.

=== Transportation ===
Oranjemund features a border post to Alexander Bay, South Africa via the Ernest Oppenheimer Bridge over the Orange River. Until the town was declared accessible to the public in 2017, only persons with pre-application of 1 month were allowed to cross the border. Before the town was proclaimed in 2011, this was the only road access to Oranjemund, as the Sperrgebiet covered all territory north and east of the town. Today Oranjemund is connected to Rosh Pinah via a tarred road along the Namibian shore of the Orange River.

Oranjemund Airport had scheduled flights to Cape Town, Lüderitz, Walvis Bay and Windhoek. As of 2023, only a scheduled flight to Windhoek Eros is offered.

== Geography ==
Oranjemund

Climate chart (precipitation, max. and min. temperature)
J	F	M	A	M	J	J	A	S	O	N	D
1 24 15	3 23 15	4 24 14	3 23 13	7 23 11	7 21 10	6 20 9	7 20 9	4 20 10	4 21 11	2 22 13	2 23 14
- █ Average max. and min. temperatures in °C
- █ Precipitation totals in mm
- Source: World Climate Guide
Imperial conversion
J	F	M	A	M	J	J	A	S	O	N	D
0 75 59	0.1 73 59	0.2 75 57	0.1 73 55	0.3 73 52	0.3 70 50	0.2 68 48	0.3 68 48	0.2 68 50	0.2 70 52	0.1 72 55	0.1 73 57
- █ Average max. and min. temperatures in °F
- █ Precipitation totals in inches

Historical population
Year	Pop.	±% p.a.
2001	4,451	—
2011	3,908	−1.29%
2023	7,736	+5.86%

=== Climate ===
Oranjemund has a desert climate (BWk, according to the Köppen climate classification), with pleasant temperatures throughout the year. The average annual precipitation is 50 mm (2 in).

== Politics ==
Oranjemund was privately owned by De Beers until 2017, and thus governed by the diamond mining company's administration. In 2011 the political administration was handed over to government which proclaimed it a town. It is now governed by a town council that has seven seats.

The first election run in Oranjemund was a by-election of the 2010 local authority election, 2,221 registered voters elected local authority councillors for the first time on 16 March 2012. SWAPO won the elections, and since 23 March 2012 Henry Edward Coetzee is the town's mayor.

SWAPO also won the 2020 local authority election but lost majority control over the town council. SWAPO obtained 935 votes and gained three seats. Independent Patriots for Change (IPC), an opposition party formed in August 2020, gained 737 votes and also three seats. The remaining seat went to the Landless People's Movement (LPM, a new party registered in 2018) with 158 votes.
