= Kuboes =

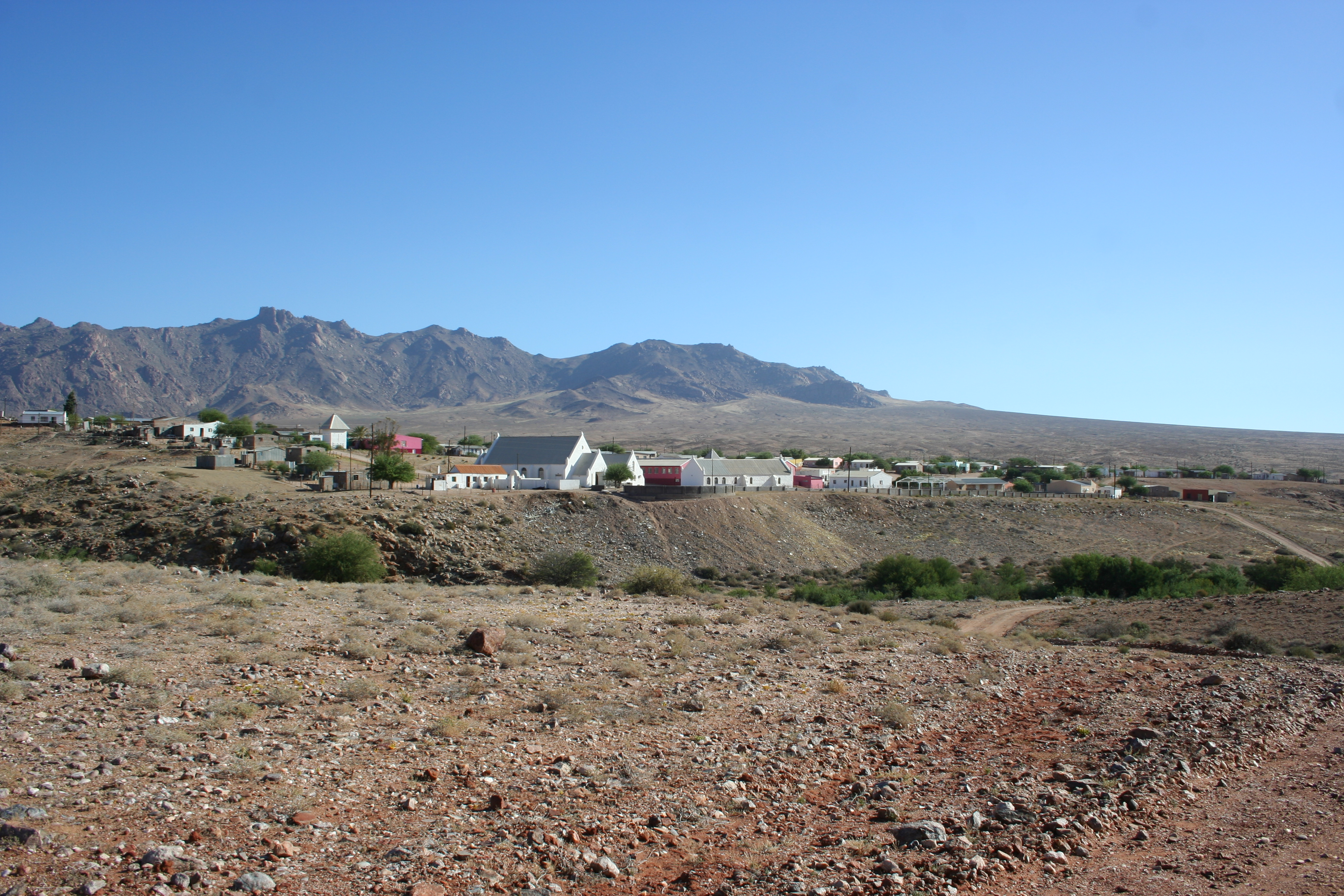
- Old mission church in Kuboes

- Location within Northern Cape Location within South Africa
- Coordinates: 28°26′49.2″S 16°59′20.76″E
- Country: South Africa
- Province: Northern Cape
- District: Namakwa
- Municipality: Richtersveld

Area
  - Total: 0.88 km^{2} (0.34 sq mi)

Population (2011)
  - Total: 948
  - Density: 1,100/km^{2} (2,800/sq mi)

Racial makeup (2011)
  - Black African: 0.6%
  - Coloured: 95.5%
  - Indian/Asian: 0.2%
  - Other: 3.7%

First languages (2011)
  - Afrikaans: 96.5%
  - English: 1.3%
  - Other: 2.2%
- Time zone: UTC+2 (SAST)
- PO box: 8292

Kuboes is a town in Richtersveld Local Municipality in the Northern Cape province of South Africa.

Kuboes was one of the first permanent settlements on the Richtersveld. The town grew around a Rhenish mission set up by revered Johan Hein, who began to preach to the nomadic population of the surrounding areas in 1844. A church was built in 1893, and eventually the itinerant population decided to set up in Kuboes itself.

Kuboes is a centre of Nama culture, and the local school is claimed to be the only school in the world that teaches the Nama language.
