= Alexander Bay, South Africa =

Alexander Bay Alexanderbaai
- Town
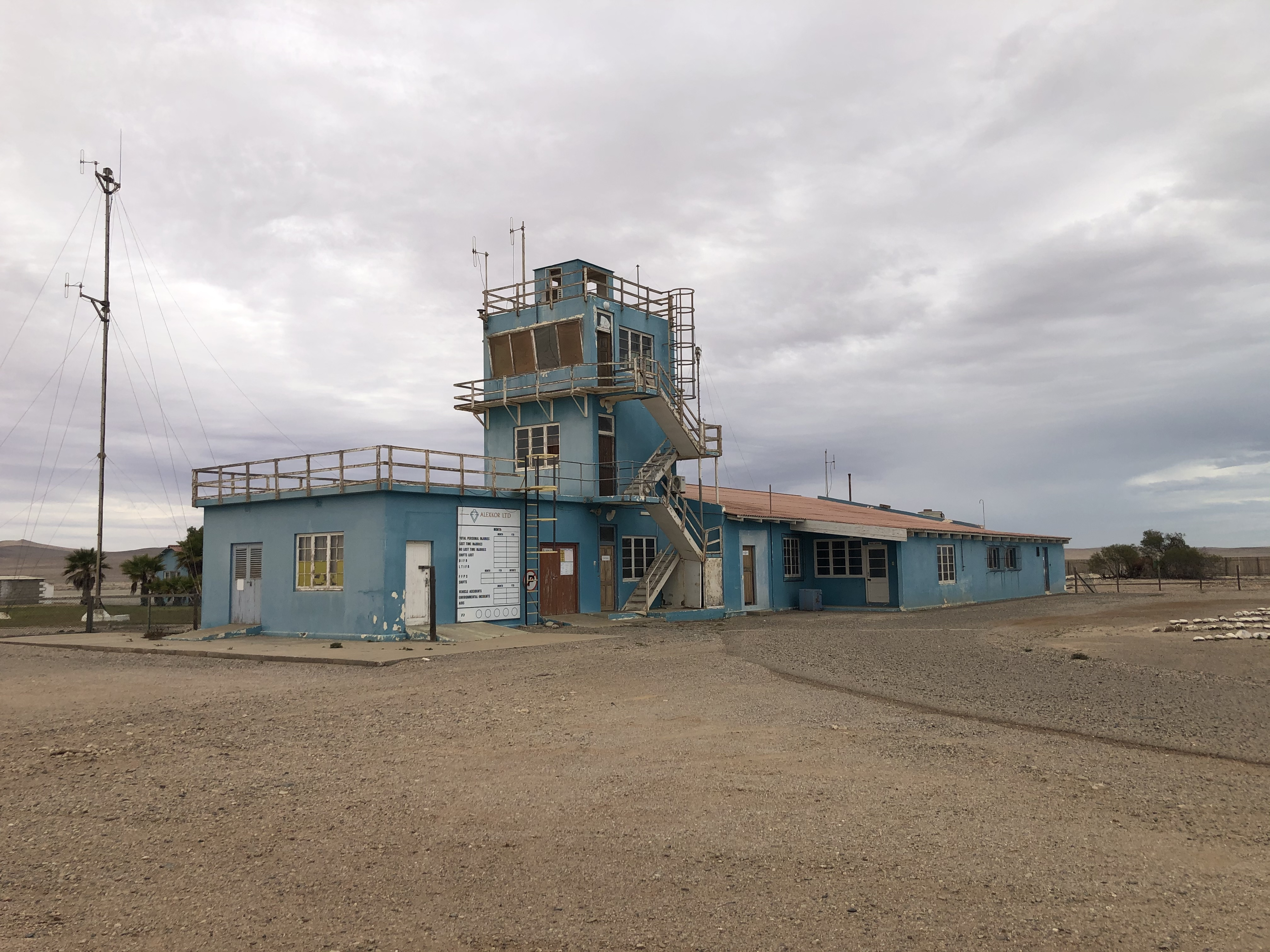
- The abandoned Alexander Bay Airport Terminal.

- Location within Northern Cape Location within South Africa Location within Africa
- Coordinates: 28°35′S 16°29′E
- Country: South Africa
- Province: Northern Cape
- District: Namakwa
- Municipality: Richtersveld

Area
  - Total: 9.25 km^{2} (3.57 sq mi)

Population (2011)
  - Total: 1,736
  - Density: 188/km^{2} (486/sq mi)

Racial makeup (2011)
  - Black African: 9.7%
  - Coloured: 74.7%
  - Indian/Asian: 0.1%
  - White: 15.2%
  - Other: 0.2%

First languages (2011)
  - Afrikaans: 92.7%
  - Xhosa: 2.6%
  - English: 1.5%
  - Other: 3.2%
- Time zone: UTC+2 (SAST)
- Postal code (street): 8290
- PO box: 8290
- Area code: 027

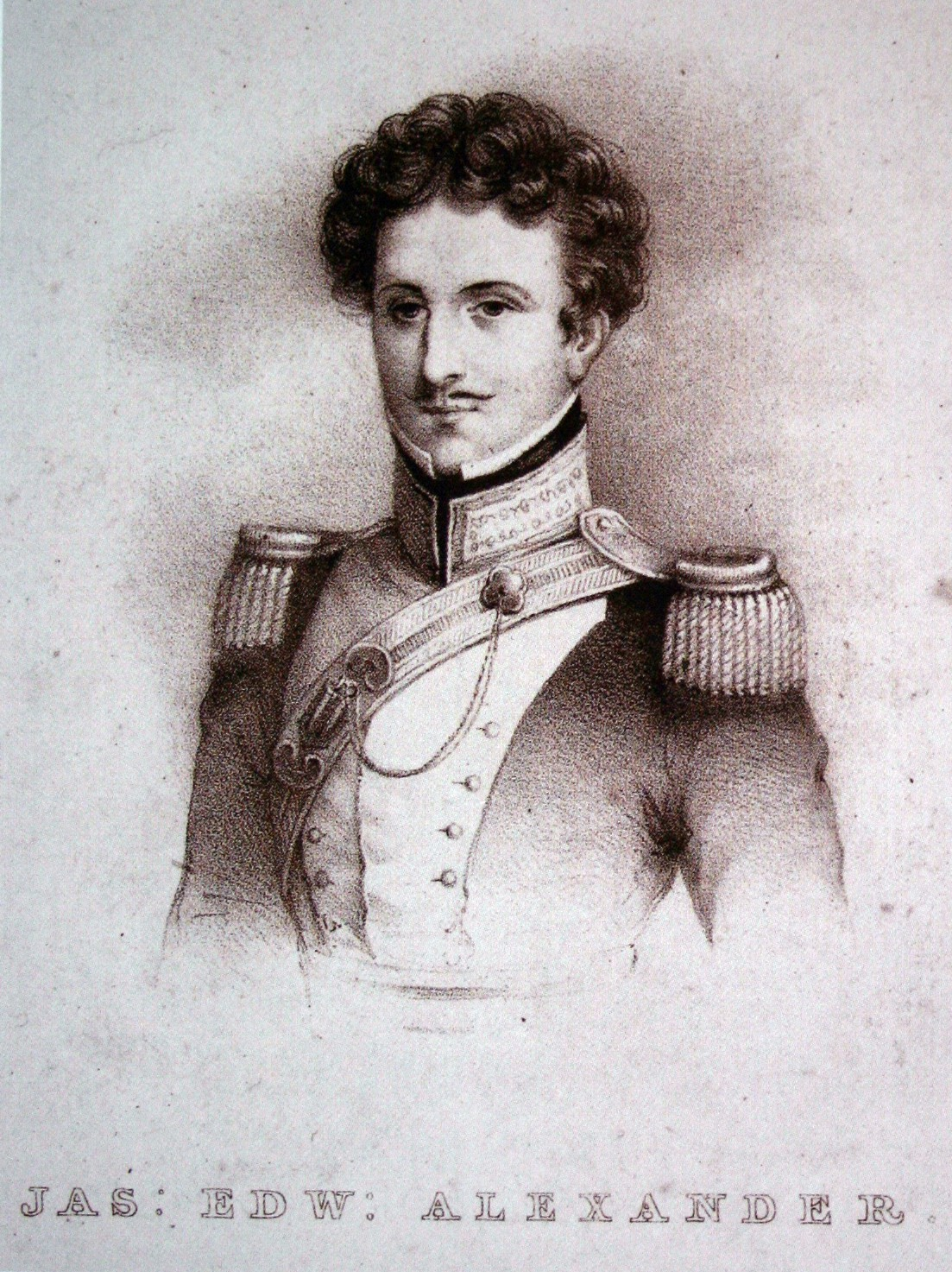
Lithograph of James Edward Alexander after whom the town is named.

Alexander Bay (Afrikaans: Alexanderbaai) is a town in the extreme north-west of South Africa. It is located on the southern bank of the Orange River mouth. It was named for Sir James Alexander, who was the first person to map the area whilst on a Royal Geographical Society expedition into Namibia in 1836. (It is mistakenly believed by many locals that it was he who first established commercial copper mining in the area.) With diamonds being discovered along the West Coast in 1925, Alexander Bay was established to service the mining industry.

The town of Oranjemund lies on the northern bank of the river, which forms the international border with Namibia. The two towns are linked by the Ernest Oppenheimer Bridge, named for Ernest Oppenheimer in 1951.

The town is served by Alexander Bay Airport.

== History ==
=== Diamonds ===
After diamonds were discovered along this coast in 1925 by Dr Hans Merensky, Alexander Bay became known for its mining activities. The resulting diamond rush led to the Diamond Coast rebellion of 1928.

=== Copper ===
Copper ore was shipped through the Richtersveld in barges down the Orange River for export from this bay. The town was a high security area and permits were needed when entered. It is no longer a high security area and no permits are needed.

== Geography and climate ==
Alexander Bay is the most northerly situated town along the west coastline of South Africa. The Orange River enters the Atlantic Ocean at Alexander Bay. The Orange River wetland forms the border between South Africa and Namibia. The Orange River wetland is a declared Ramsar site. Fields of green and orange lichen grow on a hill near the turnoff to Alexander Bay town.

It is 240 kilometres (150 mi) north-west of Springbok, the administrative centre of Namaqualand. Being near the southern end of the Namib desert, it is officially also the driest town in South Africa with an average annual rainfall of less than 51 millimetres (2 in). The cold Benguela Current in the Atlantic Ocean has a moderating influence on the coastal climate with only small variations in diurnal and seasonal temperatures.

Climate data for Alexander Bay (1961−1990)
Month	Jan	Feb	Mar	Apr	May	Jun	Jul	Aug	Sep	Oct	Nov	Dec	Year
Record high °C (°F)	41.9 (107.4)	35.1 (95.2)	42.0 (107.6)	41.3 (106.3)	36.8 (98.2)	33.4 (92.1)	33.5 (92.3)	36.1 (97.0)	41.0 (105.8)	39.5 (103.1)	42.1 (107.8)	39.1 (102.4)	42.1 (107.8)
Mean daily maximum °C (°F)	24.3 (75.7)	24.0 (75.2)	24.3 (75.7)	23.5 (74.3)	22.9 (73.2)	21.5 (70.7)	20.6 (69.1)	20.1 (68.2)	20.6 (69.1)	21.5 (70.7)	22.7 (72.9)	23.4 (74.1)	22.5 (72.5)
Daily mean °C (°F)	19.1 (66.4)	18.8 (65.8)	18.3 (64.9)	17.0 (62.6)	15.7 (60.3)	14.8 (58.6)	13.8 (56.8)	13.7 (56.7)	14.5 (58.1)	15.7 (60.3)	17.1 (62.8)	18.2 (64.8)	16.4 (61.5)
Mean daily minimum °C (°F)	15.1 (59.2)	15.1 (59.2)	14.2 (57.6)	12.5 (54.5)	10.6 (51.1)	9.9 (49.8)	8.7 (47.7)	8.9 (48.0)	9.9 (49.8)	11.3 (52.3)	12.9 (55.2)	14.2 (57.6)	11.9 (53.4)
Record low °C (°F)	10.5 (50.9)	8.7 (47.7)	8.1 (46.6)	5.7 (42.3)	4.6 (40.3)	1.9 (35.4)	2.6 (36.7)	2.3 (36.1)	3.7 (38.7)	5.8 (42.4)	7.6 (45.7)	8.6 (47.5)	1.9 (35.4)
Average rainfall mm (inches)	1 (0.0)	2 (0.1)	2 (0.1)	4 (0.2)	4 (0.2)	8 (0.3)	5 (0.2)	6 (0.2)	3 (0.1)	0 (0)	0 (0)	2 (0.1)	37 (1.5)
Average rainy days (≥ 1.0 mm)	0	0	1	1	1	2	2	2	1	1	0	0	11
Average relative humidity (%)	77	79	78	78	73	70	73	75	75	75	75	77	75
Mean monthly sunshine hours	325.5	273.8	282.1	255.0	260.1	234.9	244.6	258.2	257.7	287.4	309.6	319.9	3,308.8
Source: NOAA

Alexander Bay

Climate chart (precipitation, max. and min. temperature)
J	F	M	A	M	J	J	A	S	O	N	D
0 28 15	0 27 15	0 27 14	2 26 12	3 24 10	6 22 9	3 21 8	3 21 8	1 23 9	2 24 10	0 26 13	0 26 14
- █ Average max. and min. temperatures in °C
- █ Precipitation totals in mm
- Source: SA Explorer
Imperial conversion
J	F	M	A	M	J	J	A	S	O	N	D
0 82 59	0 81 59	0 81 57	0.1 79 54	0.1 75 50	0.2 72 48	0.1 70 46	0.1 70 46	0 73 48	0.1 75 50	0 79 55	0 79 57
- █ Average max. and min. temperatures in °F
- █ Precipitation totals in inches
