= Eksteenfontein =

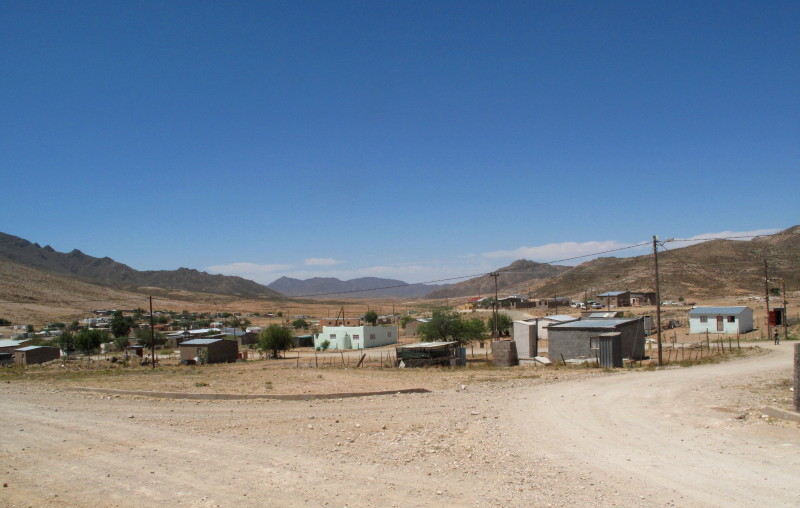
- Eksteenfontein

- Location within Northern Cape Location within South Africa
- Coordinates: 28.824°S 17.255°E
- Country: South Africa
- Province: Northern Cape
- District: Namakwa
- Municipality: Richtersveld

Area
  - Total: 0.73 km^{2} (0.28 sq mi)

Population (2011)
  - Total: 531
  - Density: 730/km^{2} (1,900/sq mi)

Racial makeup (2011)
  - Black African: 0.9%
  - Coloured: 89.3%
  - Other: 9.8%

First languages (2011)
  - Afrikaans: 94.5%
  - English: 1.3%
  - Tswana: 1.1%
  - Other: 3.0%
- Time zone: UTC+2 (SAST)
- PO box: 8284

Eksteenfontein is a town in Namakwa District Municipality in the Northern Cape province of South Africa, on the edge of the Richtersveld World Heritage Site.

The locals are mostly of Baster ancestry, people of mixed blood who were forcibly removed from the white farming area near Pofadder in 1945. The town was originally known as Stinkfontein (stinking spring), but was later renamed in honour of a Reverend Eksteen, the pastor who had helped the Baster in finding a new place to live.
