= Alexander Bay Airport =

- IATA: ALJ; ICAO: FAAB

Summary
- Elevation AMSL: 98 ft / 30 m
- Coordinates: 28°34′24″S 016°32′04″E
- Interactive map of Alexander Bay Airport

Runways
Direction	Length		Surface
Direction	m	ft	Surface
01/19	1,848	6,063	Asphalt
07/25	1,676	5,499	Gravel
11/29	1,470	4,823	Gravel
- Sources: South African AIP,

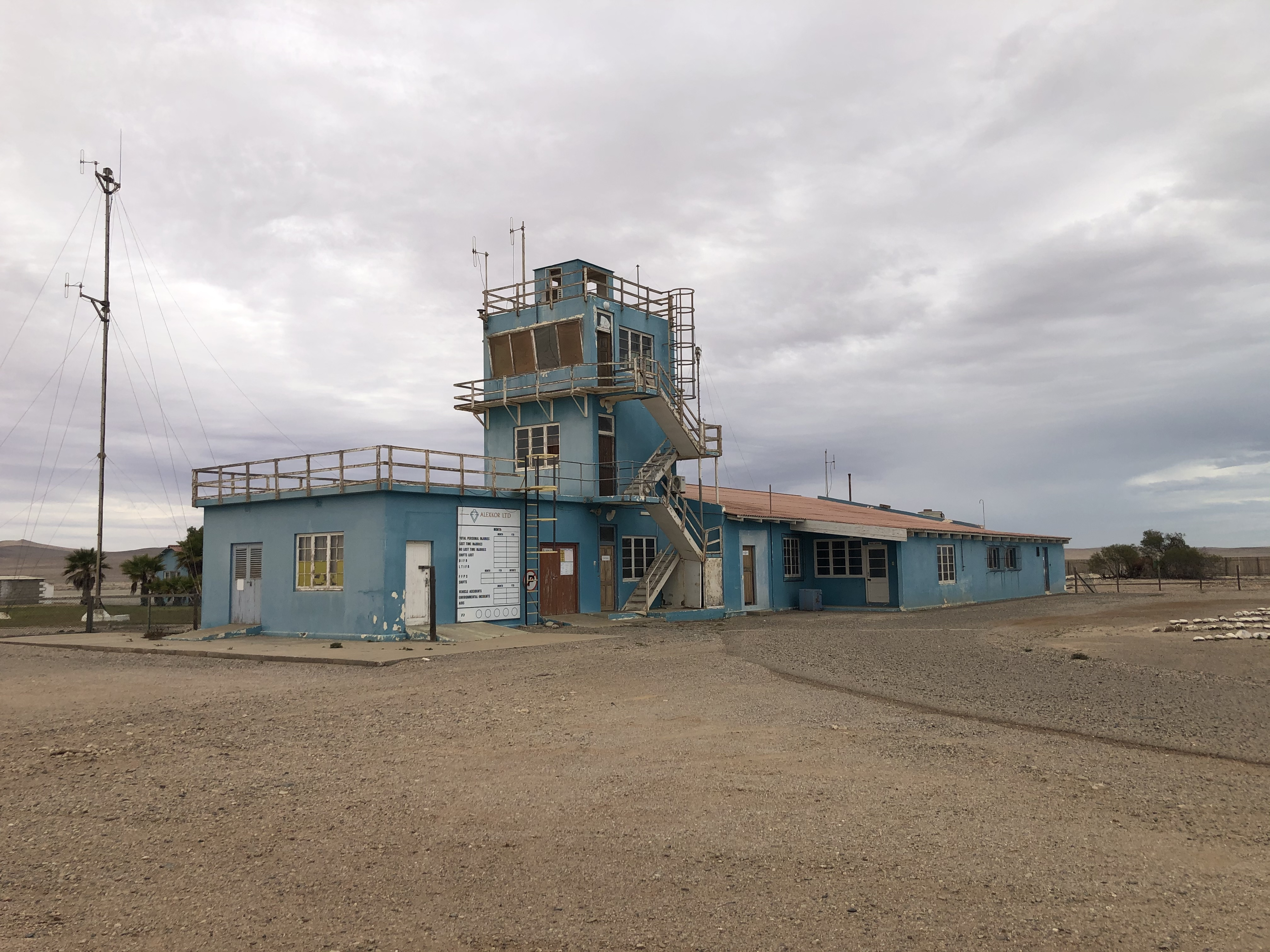
Alexander Bay Airport Terminal/

Alexander Bay Airport (IATA: ALJ, ICAO: FAAB) is an airport serving Alexander Bay (Namakwa District Municipality), a town in the Northern Cape province of South Africa. The airport was closed in 2007, and locals in Alexander Bay usually use Oranjemund Airport instead, which is just across the border in Namibia, located about 18 km (11 mi) away. The airport is occasionally used for private or specific charter aviation.

== Facilities ==
The airport resides at an elevation of 98 feet (30 m) above mean sea level. It has one asphalt paved runway designated 01/19 which measures 1,848 by 46 metres (6,063 ft × 151 ft). It also has two gravel runways: 07/25 is 1,676 by 36 metres (5,499 ft × 118 ft) and 11/29 is 1,470 by 35 metres (4,823 ft × 115 ft).

== See also ==
- List of airports in South Africa
