= Baken diamond mine =

Mine in Orange River, South Africa

Coordinates: 28.4827°S 16.7770°E

Baken Diamond Mine
- Interactive map of Baken Diamond Mine
- Location: Sanddrif (Namakwa District Municipality), Lower Orange River, Northern Cape, South Africa
- Products: Diamonds 88,000 carats (17.6 kg) in 2004
- Company: Lower Orange River Diamonds

The Baken diamond mine is a diamond mine located along the lower Orange River in South Africa. The mine is owned and operated by Lower Orange River Diamonds. The central processing plant has been operational at Baken since 2001.

In 2004, the Baken mine produced 88,063 carats (17.6126 kg); average stone size for the year was 1.29 carats (258 mg). Notable stones from production in 2004 included a 78.9 carats (15.78 g), D colour flawless diamond that sold for over US$1.8 million; and a 27.67 carats (5.534 g) pink diamond sold for over US$1.0 million.

Probable reserves are 21.2 million cubic meters of ore at an ore grade of 1.69 carats (338 mg) per 100 cubic metres (3.38 mg/m^{3}). There is a waste rock overburden of about 33 million cubic metres.

== Sources ==
- Trans Hex
