= Annie Isherwood =

English Anglican nun

Annie Cecile Ramsbottom Isherwood (1862, in Uxbridge, England - 20 February 1906) was an Anglican nun and founder of the Community of the Resurrection of our Lord in Grahamstown. She was known as Mother Cecile CR (pronounced Cecil).

== Early life ==
Annie Isherwood was born in Uxbridge, Middlesex, England on 14 November 1862 to Richard Ramsbottom-Isherwood and Anna Clarendon (born Cox). One of her older siblings was future England rugby international and cricketer Francis Isherwood. Annie was educated privately and with the death of her mother in 1870 and father in 1875 she was orphaned by the age of 12. She was brought up by relatives in London where she attended St Peter's Church, Eaton Square.

== Founding of the Community of the Resurrection of Our Lord ==
Isherwood was 21 when Allan Becher Webb, Bishop of Grahamstown, came to preach in St Peter's on the text "I was not disobedient to the heavenly vision", it was at this service she felt called to leave England and undertake work in his diocese. It was agreed that she would start an order of sisters to be known as the Community of the Resurrection of our Lord (not to be confused with the Community of the Resurrection). She was clothed as a novice on St Mark’s Day, 25 April 1884, and made her final profession on 14 November 1887. Isherwood became the mother superior of the order and was styled Mother Cecile CR.

The Sisters of the Community of the Resurrection of Our Lord opened St Peter's School, the Good Shepherd School a boarding house for the children of railway workers and an orphanage. Mother Cecile CR died at 43 of cancer exacerbated by overwork.

In 1894 the Community founded the Grahamstown Training College, an institution which played a valuable part in the development of education in southern Africa, it was forced to close down in 1975.

== Commemoration ==
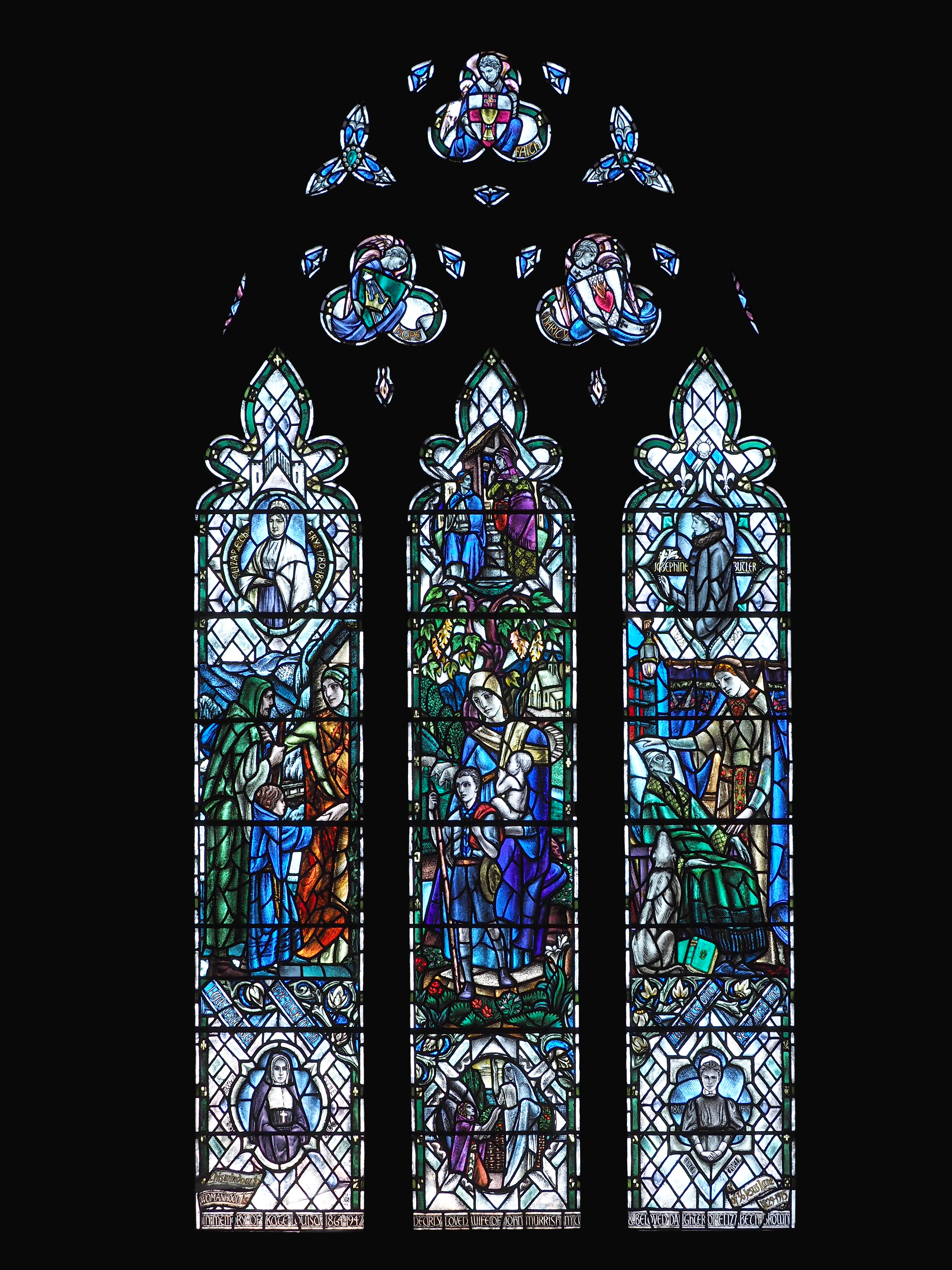
'Womanhood' window by Douglas Strachan in All Saints' Church, Cambridge; Mother Cecile is lower left

Mother Cecile CR is commemorated in the Calendar of saints (Anglican Church of Southern Africa) on 20 February. Her image is featured in a stained glass window in St George's Cathedral, Cape Town and in All Saints' Church, Cambridge and in a stained-glass window on the staircase to the Lady Chapel in Liverpool Cathedral.
