= Constance Georgina Adams =

South African collector and housewife

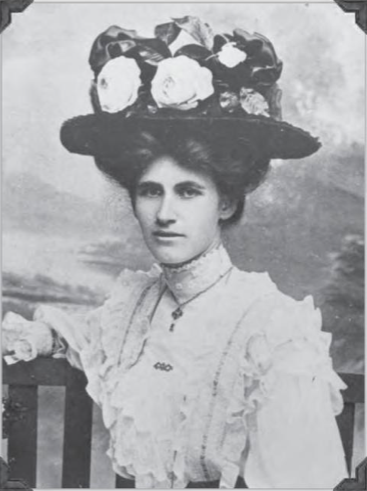
- Constance Georgina Tardrew in 1930
- Born: 6 August 1883; Cape Town, Cape Colony
- Died: 21 June 1968 (aged 84); Johannesburg, South Africa
- Other names: Constance Georgina Tardrew, Connie Adams, Daisy Adams
- Spouse: Peter Tardrew
- Father: John Adams

Constance Georgina Adams (6 August 1883 – 21 June 1968), also known as Constance Georgina Tardrew, was a South African housewife and collector of botanical specimens. Known by the nicknames Connie and Daisy, Adams was born in Cape Town and spent her early childhood on a farm in Tulbagh before moving to Warrenton. She subsequently lived in Kimberley before getting married, settling in Johannesburg where she became active in the Housewives League of South Africa. Inspired by her parents' interest in botany, she became a successful collector for both the Albany Museum in Grahamstown and McGregor Museum in Kimberley. She also cultivated a friendship with the Director of the latter, Maria Wilman. She collected over 240 specimens, which were presented to the Albany Museum, McGregor Museum and the National Herbarium in Pretoria.

== Life ==
Constance Georgina Adams, known in her early life as "Connie" and later "Daisy", was born in Cape Town, Cape Colony, on 6 August 1883. Her father, John Adams, was a farmer in the district of Tulbagh, and she spent the first few years of her life on the family farm, Waterfalls. At age 14, she attended Vredenburgh High School, in Cape Town where she won numerous prizes for botany, and then later trained as a teacher. In 1907, the family moved to Kimberley, where she lived until leaving home. In 1910 she married her cousin, Peter Tardrew, moving first to Bloemhof and then to Johannesburg in 1936, where she became an active member of the Housewives League of South Africa. The group was an early example of integration between the races at a time of expanding apartheid across the country. She died on 21 June 1968.

== Collecting career ==
Adams developed a passion for botany at an early age. Her family were keen botanists and took an interest in wild and cultivated flowers, and where among the founders of the first wild-flower show in the district. In 1890, the family moved to Warrenton, where Adams started school. She subsequently spent the vacations while at High School collecting specimens for the Herbarium at the Albany Museum in Grahamstown. Selmar Schonland, the Director, was a friend of the family and encouraged her. This interest flourished into a substantial collection of over 240 items, which she presented to the museum on 19 September 1919 after moving to Bloemhof. In the meantime, she had become friends with Maria Wilman, Director of the McGregor Museum in Kimberley, for whom she also collected.

Her collections are currently held in three herbaria, in Grahamstown, Kimberley and Pretoria, the last in the National Herbarium at the Pretoria National Botanical Garden. Amongst the specimens which are included are Convovulus boedeckeriamus and Convovulus ocelatus. Her collections were particularly important to the identification of the plants of Griqualand.
