= Old Provost =

Former South African military prison

Old Provost Prison
- The Old Provost March 2013
- Interactive map of the Old Provost Prison area

General information
- Status: Provincial Heritage Site
- Location: The Old Provost, Lucas Avenue, Grahamstown, South Africa
- Coordinates: 33.314989°S 26.519842°E
- Completed: 1838
- Renovated: 1982

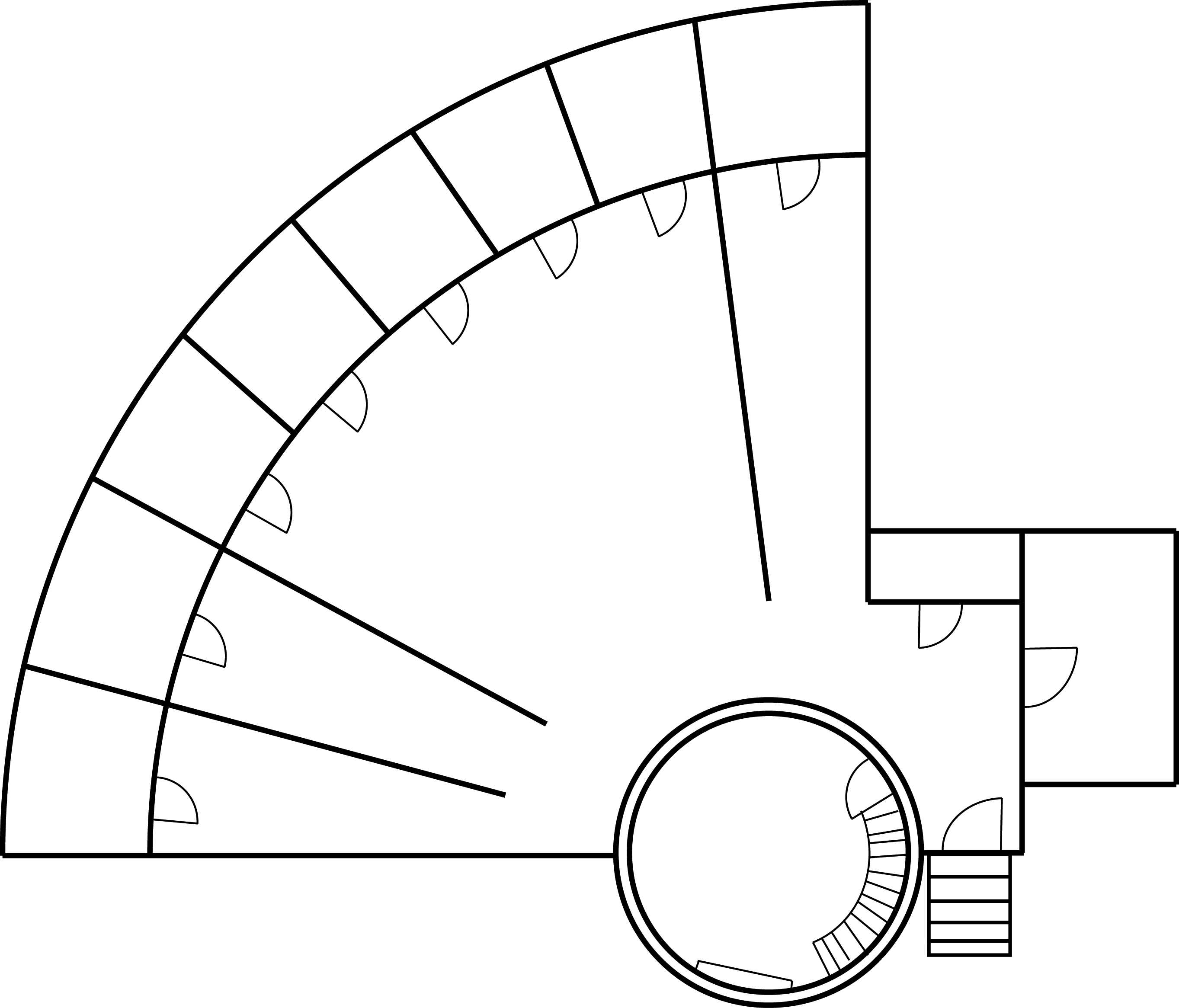
Sketch layout

The Old Provost is a military prison finished in early 1838 as part of efforts to fortify the small city of Grahamstown, in the Eastern Cape, South Africa. These efforts were part of the Governor of the Cape Colony's, Sir Benjamin d'Urban, 1835 defensive plan which includes the building of Fort Selwyn and the fortification of the Drostdy.

It is situated on Lucas Avenue between the Old Military Hospital, which is now part of the Rhodes University Botany Department, and the Grahamstown Botanical Gardens.

Built to a design adapted from Jeremy Bentham's Panopticon prison. This design is unique in the British Cape Colony. Designed to allow for constant surveillance of the prisoners. The prison is shaped as a quarter circle with eight cells, roughly 2m by 3m each, running along the curved arc of wall with the exercise area's for each cell radiating out from the double story watch tower, which has portals looking into each exercise area.

In 1937 the Old Provost was declared a heritage site. In 1982 and 1983 the Old Provost underwent restoration and was put under control of the Albany Museum. During the restoration the remains of some of the exercise area walls were discovered and restored.

== Present ==
The Old Provost has been renovated and operates as The Provost Café as of the 8th of April 2013. As of March 2020, The Provost Café is closed, and LA Café is now housed in the building
