= List of heritage sites in Albany, South Africa =

This is a list of the heritage sites in Albany as recognised by the South African Heritage Resource Agency.

SAHRA identifier	Site name	Description	Town	District	NHRA status	Coordinates	Image
9/2/003/0004	Botanical Gardens, Grahamstown	The land on which the Botanical Gardens was established was granted to the Albany Botanical Gardens by the Governor of the Cape, Sir George Cathcart, with transfer being passed on 19 October 1853. A fine avenue of oak trees runs through its centre. It originally formed part of the Drostdy estate. These botanical gardens are the second oldest in the country. Type of site: Botanical Garden.	Grahamstown	Albany	Provincial Heritage Site	33°18′54″S 26°31′15″E	The land on which the Botanical Gardens was established was granted to the Albany Botanical Gardens by the Governor of the Cape, Sir George Cathcart, with transfer being passed on 19 October 1853. A fine avenue of oak trees runs through its centre. It originally formed part of the Drostdy estate. These botanical gardens are the second oldest in the country. Type of site: Botanical Garden.
9/2/003/0005	Old cemeteries, Anderson Street, Grahamstown	Surrounding walls and gates plus memorials and gravestones. First cemeteries in use for all of C19. Type of site: Cemetery. Current use: Religious – Cemeteries.	Grahamstown	Albany	Provisional Protection	33°18′20″S 26°32′02″E	Upload Photo
9/2/003/0006	Old Gaol, 40A Somerset Street, Grahamstown	Perimeter wall around three sides. Front range with pediment missing. Slate roof to front. Corrugated elsewhere. Brickword plastered. Mainly single storeyed. Centre block double storey. The construction of this gaol commenced on 16 April 1813. In April 1822 the Magistrate of Albany reported that the gaol was too small, and was offensive in that a residential area adjoined it. It was [closed?] in 1824 whereafter it became a school and later a library. Type of site: Gaol Previous use: Prison. Current use: Offices.	Grahamstown	Albany	Provincial Heritage Site	33°18′49″S 26°31′23″E	Perimeter wall around three sides. Front range with pediment missing. Slate roof to front. Corrugated elsewhere. Brickword plastered. Mainly single storeyed. Centre block double storey. The construction of this gaol commenced on 16 April 1813. In April 1822 the Magistrate of Albany reported that the gaol was too small, and was offensive in that a residential area adjoined it. It was [closed?] in 1824 whereafter it became a school and later a library. Type of site: Gaol Previous use: Prison. Current use: Offices.
9/2/003/0007	Huntley Street School, Huntley Street, Grahamstown	Original building symmetrical with entrance porch and anval style – hood moulds to windows. The school was built of local Witteberg quartzite which in the course of the years has weathered to a rich brown colour. The old school in Huntley Street is of the greatest historical and architectural importance. It is generally accepted that this is the oldest Anglican school building in the Republic. The foundation stone was laid on 18 June 1844, by Mrs. Hare, wife of [unknown]. Type of site: School. Current use: School Good Shepherd School, Grahamstown. This building was opened in 1849 as the school of St. George's Church and from then onward played an important part in education. The first classes of St. Andrews College were held in it.	Grahamstown	Albany	Provincial Heritage Site	33°18′46″S 26°31′32″E	Upload Photo
9/2/003/0008	Eastern Star Museum, 4 Anglo-African Street, Grahamstown	Single storey. Single room with additions. Corrugated iron roof and stone work painted. Verandah rebuilt with curved sheeting. Built C1861 – on 1863 MAP. Part of Anglo-African Complex. Originally a schoolroom, then house, now a museum. Type of site: Educational. Previous use: Schoolroom. Current use: Museum. Erected in 1861 to serve as the first classroom for St. Andrews College. It continued as such until 1872, after which it was used successively as a Masonic lodge, business premises and a dwelling house.	Grahamstown	Albany	Provincial Heritage Site	33°18′36″S 26°31′30″E	Upload Photo
9/2/003/0009	Drostdy Gateway, Somerset Street, Grahamstown	Surveyor Knobel's layout of Grahamstown was focussed on a main street that ran from the triangular military camp in a westerly direction up the hill. He foresaw that the military area offered a most suitable site for a church or other public building. Type of site: Gateway.	Grahamstown	Albany	Provincial Heritage Site	33°18′46″S 26°31′18″E	Surveyor Knobel's layout of Grahamstown was focussed on a main street that ran from the triangular military camp in a westerly direction up the hill. He foresaw that the military area offered a most suitable site for a church or other public building. Type of site: Gateway.
9/2/003/0011	St Peter's Anglican Church, Sidbury, Albany District	Type of site: Church. One of the earliest country Anglican churches in the Albany District. Displays architectural merit.	Sidbury	Albany	Provincial Heritage Site	33°26′27″S 26°19′38″E	Upload Photo
9/2/003/0013	56 Beaufort Street, Grahamstown	Double storey, part double pile 3 bay symmetrical plan plus single storey additions with pagoda bow windows. Wooden double storey verandah. Corrugated iron flat roofs. Walls brick plastered. Original doors and small pane sash windows. Type of site: House Current use: Domestic – House. This house is the only known example in South Africa of the European-Chinese architectural style of the 18th and 19th centuries. It is a double-storeyed house with two projecting pavilions with bow-fronted ends.	Grahamstown	Albany	Provincial Heritage Site	33°18′50″S 26°31′40″E	Upload Photo
9/2/003/0014	St Bartholomew's Church, Market Street, Grahamstown	Three bay nave and chancel. No side aisles. Side entry porch and small belfry. Slate roof. Walls dressed stone, brick dressings. Wooden windows. School house/parish hall of similar materials. Built 1861. Type of site: Church. Current use: Religious – Church.	Grahamstown	Albany	Provincial Heritage Site	33°18′52″S 26°31′52″E	Three bay nave and chancel. No side aisles. Side entry porch and small belfry. Slate roof. Walls dressed stone, brick dressings. Wooden windows. School house/parish hall of similar materials. Built 1861. Type of site: Church. Current use: Religious – Church.
9/2/003/0015	Hayton's Building, 94 High Street, Grahamstown	The Divisional Council Building is a three-storeyed building built in two sections. Each section has its own hipped roof; the floors are served by two staircases, one in front and one of steeper gradient and narrower at the back. Large yellow wood beams. This building is an excellent example of an early three-storeyed building built in two sections to a symmetrical plan. The first section dates from 1860–62 and the latter section from the late 1860s. The facade of this building is of outstanding archite. Current use: Offices.	Grahamstown	Albany	Provincial Heritage Site	33°18′39″S 26°31′33″E	Upload Photo
9/2/003/0016	National English Literary Museum, 87 Beaufort Street, Grahamstown	The Priest's House is a double storeyed building in the Georgian style with a Roman colonnaded portico leading onto a wrought iron balustrade with steps leading to street level. The lower floor consists of a kitchen and service rooms. The house was built by Bishop Patric Moran who succeeded Bishop Devereaux in 1856 and celebrated his first High Mass in St Patrick's Cathedral on 26 November 1856. Type of site: House. Current use: Museum. This double-storeyed house with its Georgian and Romanesque features was built by Bishop Patrick Moran in 1860 as residence for the priests of St. Patrick's Cathedral. Bishop Moran was succeeded by the Rev. James David Richards, the resident priest.	Grahamstown	Albany	Provincial Heritage Site	33°18′55″S 26°31′29″E	Upload Photo
9/2/003/0017	Commemoration Church, High Street, Grahamstown	Early example of a gothic revival church in South Africa. Fine riple bay facade with buttresses and pinnacles. Railings and wall important. Interior features. Type of site: Church. Current use: Religious – Church. The Commemoration Church, which is predominantly in the neo-Gothic style, was erected to mark the silver jubilee of the arrival of the British settlers of 1820. The foundation-stone was laid on 10 April 1845. The church was inaugurated on 24 November 1850.	Grahamstown	Albany	Provincial Heritage Site	33°18′33″S 26°31′41″E	Early example of a gothic revival church in South Africa. Fine riple bay facade with buttresses and pinnacles. Railings and wall important. Interior features. Type of site: Church. Current use: Religious – Church. The Commemoration Church, which is predominantly in the neo-Gothic style, was erected to mark the silver jubilee of the arrival of the British settlers of 1820. The foundation-stone was laid on 10 April 1845. The church was inaugurated on 24 November 1850. Media related to Commemoration Church, Grahamstown at Wikimedia Commons
9/2/003/0018	Oatlands House, 10 Caroline Close, Grahamstown	Single storey complex plan. Front, three rooms and wrap round verandah. L-shape wing to rear. Hipped corrugated iron roof and walls brick plastered. Sash windows and French doors. Wooden posts to verandah. The house was built in 1823 for Col. Henry Somerset, son of Lord Charles Somerset. It is an important example of 19th-century Georgian architecture. Type of site: House. Current use: Domestic – House.	Grahamstown	Albany	Provincial Heritage Site	33°17′56″S 26°31′18″E	Upload Photo
9/2/003/0019	Old Military Hospital, Rhodes University, Grahamstown	Inside the university grounds, i.e. the former Drostdy grounds, is another old building which recalls the tempestuous years of 1835 to 1842 when the Governor of the Cape Colony decided to use the Drostdy and the surrounding area in the defence. Type of site: Military. Cape Parliament sat in this building in 1864. Earlier a military hospital from the 1830s.	Grahamstown	Albany	Provincial Heritage Site	33°31′26″S 26°52′00″E	Inside the university grounds, i.e. the former Drostdy grounds, is another old building which recalls the tempestuous years of 1835 to 1842 when the Governor of the Cape Colony decided to use the Drostdy and the surrounding area in the defence. Type of site: Military. Cape Parliament sat in this building in 1864. Earlier a military hospital from the 1830s.
9/2/003/0020	Drostdy Barracks, Rhodes University, Grahamstown	Type of site: House. Early military building comprising part of the Grahamstown Drostdy complex.	Grahamstown	Albany	Provincial Heritage Site	33°18′47″S 26°31′12″E	Type of site: House. Early military building comprising part of the Grahamstown Drostdy complex.
9/2/003/0021	Drostdy Lodge, Rhodes University, Grahamstown	Type of site: House. Early military building comprising part of the Grahamstown Drostdy complex.	Grahamstown	Albany	Provincial Heritage Site	33°18′46″S 26°31′12″E	Upload Photo
9/2/003/0022	Old Royal Engineers Building, off Prince Alfred Street, Grahamstown	Central portion three bay double storey under hipped roof. Side wings under double pitch. Roofs corrugated iron. Walls dressed stone. Originally Royal Engineers building C1840.	Grahamstown	Albany	Provincial Heritage Site	33°18′40″S 26°31′10″E	Upload Photo
9/2/003/0023	58 Beaufort Street, Grahamstown	Double storey, double pile four bay asymmetrical plan. Double storey part brick, part wooden verandah. Corrugated iron roof. Brick plastered walls and stone plinth. Original? Door and small pane sash windows. Type of site: House. Current use: Domestic – House. This house is a typical example of a British settler house with the side gables and the double-storey style. The house dates back to the period shortly after the founding of Grahamstown.	Grahamstown	Albany	Provincial Heritage Site	33°18′50″S 26°31′40″E	Upload Photo
9/2/003/0025-001	Old Wesleyan Chapel, Fort England Hospital, Grahamstown	Type of site: Chapel.	Grahamstown	Albany	Provincial Heritage Site	33°18′36″S 26°32′34″E	Upload Photo
9/2/003/0025-002	Old School Hall, Fort England Hospital, Grahamstown	Type of site: School.	Grahamstown	Albany	Provincial Heritage Site	33°18′57″S 26°32′36″E	Upload Photo
9/2/003/0026	Muirhead and Gowie Building, 42–44 High Street, Grahamstown	Splendid Neo-Baroque facade. Steeply pitched pediment plus corner turret. Heavy modulated cornice and frieze. Coupled columns and ranges of windows. Original shop front missing. Destroyed in fire of 1906. Rebuilt in 1907 to design of H. Walker – Port Elizabeth. See c5 in pilot study. Type of site: Commercial. Current use: Commercial – Shops. Late Victorian/Edwardian double storey shop, forming part of important grouping.	Grahamstown	Albany	Provincial Heritage Site	33°18′35″S 26°31′40″E	Splendid Neo-Baroque facade. Steeply pitched pediment plus corner turret. Heavy modulated cornice and frieze. Coupled columns and ranges of windows. Original shop front missing. Destroyed in fire of 1906. Rebuilt in 1907 to design of H. Walker – Port Elizabeth. See c5 in pilot study. Type of site: Commercial. Current use: Commercial – Shops. Late Victorian/Edwardian double storey shop, forming part of important grouping.
9/2/003/0027	Shaw Hall, 22 High Street, Grahamstown	Three bay facade divided into two storeys. Cornice and entablature small pediment. Heavy pilasters. Small pane sash windows. Round arched front double door. Shaw Hall was built as a Methodist Church at a cost of R6 000. It was inaugurated on 16 December 1832, and was known as the "Wesley Chapel". It had galleries along three sides and could seat about 800 people. It was used as a church until the Commemora. Neo-classical building erected in 1831 and dedicated on 16 December 1832. Named after the Rev. William Shaw, founder of the Methodist Church in South Africa. Cape Parliament was opened in this building on 28 April 1864.	Grahamstown	Albany	Provincial Heritage Site	33°18′32″S 26°31′46″E	Three bay facade divided into two storeys. Cornice and entablature small pediment. Heavy pilasters. Small pane sash windows. Round arched front double door. Shaw Hall was built as a Methodist Church at a cost of R6 000. It was inaugurated on 16 December 1832, and was known as the "Wesley Chapel". It had galleries along three sides and could seat about 800 people. It was used as a church until the Commemora. Neo-classical building erected in 1831 and dedicated on 16 December 1832. Named after the Rev. William Shaw, founder of the Methodist Church in South Africa. Cape Parliament was opened in this building on 28 April 1864.
9/2/003/0028	Chapel House, 9-11 Bartholomew Street, Grahamstown	Double storey, double pile plan. Three bay asymmetrical facade. Slate roof and walls brick plastered. Small pane sash and casement windows and French doors. On street. Formerly church of 1828. See N.M.C. Files Type of site: Chapel. Current use: Domestic – House. This Georgian double-storeyed building, which was erected in 1823, is the oldest Baptist church in South Africa. The foundation stone was laid on 6 January by William Miller, the 1820 settler founder of the Baptist Church in South Africa.	Grahamstown	Albany	Provincial Heritage Site	33°18′51″S 26°31′50″E	Upload Photo
9/2/003/0029	1832 and 1850 Methodist Churches, Salem, Albany District	This church complex, consisting of the 1832 re-erected church, the 1850 neo-Gothic church and the early nineteenth century ring-wall, is closely associated with the 1820 settlers, as well as the start of Methodism in South Africa. Type of site: Church.	Salem	Albany	Provincial Heritage Site	33°28′17″S 26°29′06″E	This church complex, consisting of the 1832 re-erected church, the 1850 neo-Gothic church and the early nineteenth century ring-wall, is closely associated with the 1820 settlers, as well as the start of Methodism in South Africa. Type of site: Church.
9/2/003/0029/001	1832 Methodist Church, Salem, Albany District	The little 1820 settler village of Salem is situated barely 24 kilometres south of Grahamstown on the road to Alexandria. This church complex, consisting of the 1832 re-erected church, the 1850 neo-Gothic church and the early nineteenth century ring-wall, is closely associated with the 1820 settlers, as well as the start of Methodism in South Africa. Type of site: Church.	Salem	Albany	Provincial Heritage Site	33°28′17″S 26°29′06″E	The little 1820 settler village of Salem is situated barely 24 kilometres south of Grahamstown on the road to Alexandria. This church complex, consisting of the 1832 re-erected church, the 1850 neo-Gothic church and the early nineteenth century ring-wall, is closely associated with the 1820 settlers, as well as the start of Methodism in South Africa. Type of site: Church.
9/2/003/0029/002	1850 Methodist Church, Salem, Albany District	This church complex, consisting of the 1832 re-erected church, the 1850 neo-Gothic church and the early nineteenth century ring-wall, is closely associated with the 1820 settlers, as well as the start of Methodism in South Africa. Type of site: Church.	Salem	Albany	Provincial Heritage Site	33°28′17″S 26°29′06″E	This church complex, consisting of the 1832 re-erected church, the 1850 neo-Gothic church and the early nineteenth century ring-wall, is closely associated with the 1820 settlers, as well as the start of Methodism in South Africa. Type of site: Church.
9/2/003/0030	Baptist Mother Church, Bathurst Street, Grahamstown	Simple box like church. Five bays long. Corrugated iron roof with brickwork plastered. Front from late C19. Simple mouldings. Type of site: Church. Current use: Church.	Grahamstown	Albany	Provincial Heritage Site	33°18′38″S 26°31′47″E	Simple box like church. Five bays long. Corrugated iron roof with brickwork plastered. Front from late C19. Simple mouldings. Type of site: Church. Current use: Church.
9/2/003/0033	Remains of Shaw Chapel, 4–6 Chapel Street, Grahamstown	During the 1860s a powerful movement developed in the Eastern Province to break away from the western areas of the Colony and establish a separate government. Type of site: Chapel. This structure is all that remains of the Methodist Chapel, which was the first building erected for Christian worship in Grahamstown. William Shaw was chiefly responsible for its erection. It was dedicated on 10 November 1822.	Grahamstown	Albany	Provincial Heritage Site	33°18′33″S 26°31′52″E	Upload Photo
9/2/003/0038	Temlett House, 53 Beaufort Street, Grahamstown	DOUBLE STOREY, DOUBLE PILE PLAN WITH SYMMETRICAL WINGS. SLATE ROOF WITH STONE WALLS, PLASTERED FRONT. ORIGINAL DOOR AND SMALL PANE SASH WINDOWS. STOEP IN FRONT. VERY FINE LATE GEORGIAN HOUSE. ON 1863 MAP. BACK VIEW IN VAN DER RIET V111.22. HOUSE BUILT C1840. SEE N.M.C. FILES. Type of site: House Current use: Domestic – House. This house is an outstanding example of an early Nineteenth Century Georgian dwelling in South Africa.	Grahamstown	Albany	Provincial Heritage Site	33°18′42″S 26°31′54″E	Upload Photo
9/2/003/0039	Grahamstown Railway Station, High Street, Grahamstown	Type of site: Railway Station. An interesting stone railway station.	Grahamstown	Albany	Provincial Heritage Site	33°18′26″S 26°31′57″E	Upload Photo
9/2/003/0039-001	Post box, Grahamstown Railway station, Grahamstown	A solid rectangular box of cast iron painted 'post office' red, bearing the royal crown 7 cypher with a slotted aperture for insertion of postal items, built into the stone facade of the station building just to the right of the main entrance of a type first supplied in 1857 but continuing even into the reign of Edward VlI as this one. This is the second oldest surviving post box in Grahamstown. It is a type, which, as already indicated, also back to 1857, though the earliest such boxes in So Type of site: Post Box, Railway Station. This is the second oldest surviving post box in Grahamstown.	Grahamstown	Albany	Provincial Heritage Site	33°18′26″S 26°31′57″E	Upload Photo
9/2/003/0040	Cock House, 10 Market Street, Grahamstown	DOUBLE STOREY, SINGLE PILE 6 BAY ASYMMETRICAL PLAN PLUS ADDITIONS. DOUBLE STOREY WOODEN VERANDAH. SLATE ROOF AND WALLS BRICK PLASTERED. LARGE PANE SASH WINDOWS AND FRENCH DOORS UPSTAIRS. ON STREET. VERY IMPORTANT BUILDING. ON 1863 MAP. ORIGINALLY C1840. MODERNISED C1880. SEE P.70 IN GRAHAMSTOWN FROM COTTAGE TO VILLA BY R & B REYNOLDS. Type of site: House Current use: Domestic – House.	Grahamstown	Albany	Provincial Heritage Site	33°18′46″S 26°32′04″E	DOUBLE STOREY, SINGLE PILE 6 BAY ASYMMETRICAL PLAN PLUS ADDITIONS. DOUBLE STOREY WOODEN VERANDAH. SLATE ROOF AND WALLS BRICK PLASTERED. LARGE PANE SASH WINDOWS AND FRENCH DOORS UPSTAIRS. ON STREET. VERY IMPORTANT BUILDING. ON 1863 MAP. ORIGINALLY C1840. MODERNISED C1880. SEE P.70 IN GRAHAMSTOWN FROM COTTAGE TO VILLA BY R & B REYNOLDS. Type of site: House Current use: Domestic – House.
9/2/003/0042	Kariega Baptist Church, Albany District	The foundations and part of the walls of this church were built in 1834, It was to have been the first Baptist Church in South Africa outside Grahamstown but three successive Frontier Wars intervened before it was completed in 1854. Type of site: Church Current use: Church. Take Port Alfred road from Grahamstown. After 5 km take the Southwell turn-off. Travel a further ?km to the Berkley South turn-off. After 2.6 km there is a turn-off to the right. The church is situated 100 m along this turn-off.. The foundations and part of the walls of this church were built in 1834. It was to have been the first Baptist church in South Africa outside Grahamstown but three successive Frontier Wars intervened before it was completed in 1854.		Albany	Provincial Heritage Site	33°27′30″S 26°36′20″E	Upload Photo
9/2/003/0043	Beaumont and Rice Building, 112 High Street, Grahamstown	Double storey warehouse. Pyramidal roof. Corrugated iron roof. Dressed stone front facade. Other walls plastered. Arched heads to first floor windows. Flat arch below – Four bay plus simple cornice. Type of site: Commercial Current use: Warehouse – Offices. A fine building with front facade of Bathurst sandstone.	Grahamstown	Albany	Provincial Heritage Site	33°18′42″S 26°31′27″E	Upload Photo
9/2/003/0044	Farmerfield Methodist Church, Albany District	The Farmerfield Estate on which the Methodist church is situated, was established by the Rev. William Shaw to provide for three separate displaced communities speaking Xhosa (Fingo and Gqunukwebe), Dutch (emancipated slaves), and Tswana (refugees of Mfeca Type of site: Church. This neo-Gothic Methodist Church was designed by the Rev. Thornley Smith and was erected in 1844. It originally served a community established by the Rev. William Shaw as an experiment in social rehabilitation.	Albany	Albany	Provincial Heritage Site	33°29′31″S 26°32′50″E	The Farmerfield Estate on which the Methodist church is situated, was established by the Rev. William Shaw to provide for three separate displaced communities speaking Xhosa (Fingo and Gqunukwebe), Dutch (emancipated slaves), and Tswana (refugees of Mfeca Type of site: Church. This neo-Gothic Methodist Church was designed by the Rev. Thornley Smith and was erected in 1844. It originally served a community established by the Rev. William Shaw as an experiment in social rehabilitation. Media related to Farmerfield, Eastern Cape at Wikimedia Commons
9/2/003/0045	Observatory Museum, 10 Bathurst Street, Grahamstown	Front facade has balustrade parapet and cornice. Hood moulds plus panels to first floor windows. Plastered ashlar below. Fine 1880s facade. Complex building behind. This building is unique in structure and was used by Henry Carter Galpin, watchmaker and jeweller, as a home and business premises soon after his arrival in Grahamstown in 1849. In 1880 Galpin installed a camera obscura in the turret of the building. Current use: Commercial – Observatory. This building is unique in structure and was used by Henry Carter Galpin, watchmaker and jeweller, as a home and business premises soon after his arrival in Grahamstown in 1849. In 1880 Galpin installed a camera obscura in the turret of the building.	Grahamstown	Albany	Provincial Heritage Site	33°18′44″S 26°31′50″E	Front facade has balustrade parapet and cornice. Hood moulds plus panels to first floor windows. Plastered ashlar below. Fine 1880s facade. Complex building behind. This building is unique in structure and was used by Henry Carter Galpin, watchmaker and jeweller, as a home and business premises soon after his arrival in Grahamstown in 1849. In 1880 Galpin installed a camera obscura in the turret of the building. Current use: Commercial – Observatory. This building is unique in structure and was used by Henry Carter Galpin, watchmaker and jeweller, as a home and business premises soon after his arrival in Grahamstown in 1849. In 1880 Galpin installed a camera obscura in the turret of the building. Media related to Observatory Museum, Grahamstown at Wikimedia Commons
9/2/003/0046	The Retreat, 1 Prince Alfred Street, Grahamstown	Double storey, now double pile symmetrical three bay plan. Double pitch asymmetrical corrugated iron roof. Walls brick plastered. Mixture of small and large pane-sash windows. Bay windows (C1880) downstairs. Original front door. This property was transferred to Piet Retief on 16 July 1821. It is presumed that he built the oldest portion of this building, although the remaining portion of the double-storeyed house dates from the eighteen-forties. Another prominent pioneer of the E Type of site: House Current use: Domestic – House. This property was transferred to Piet Retief on 16 July 1821. It is presumed that he built the oldest portion of this building, although the remaining portion of the double-storeyed house dates from the eighteen-forties.	Grahamstown	Albany	Provincial Heritage Site	33°18′41″S 26°31′15″E	Double storey, now double pile symmetrical three bay plan. Double pitch asymmetrical corrugated iron roof. Walls brick plastered. Mixture of small and large pane-sash windows. Bay windows (C1880) downstairs. Original front door. This property was transferred to Piet Retief on 16 July 1821. It is presumed that he built the oldest portion of this building, although the remaining portion of the double-storeyed house dates from the eighteen-forties. Another prominent pioneer of the E Type of site: House Current use: Domestic – House. This property was transferred to Piet Retief on 16 July 1821. It is presumed that he built the oldest portion of this building, although the remaining portion of the double-storeyed house dates from the eighteen-forties.
9/2/003/0047	32, 34 High Street, Grahamstown	This is a fine late Victorian shop front of two floors with a domed corner tower jutting out and overhanging curved verandah roof. Free Renaissance facade treatment with fenestration of paired arches. Dates from 1872. Six bays to high street and two to B These late nineteenth century shops, with their Neo Renaissance façades, form an integral part of the architectural character of High Street, and are an important element in the historical city centre of Grahamstown. Type of site: Commercial Current use: Commercial – Shops. Late Victorian/Edwardian double storey shop, forming part of important grouping. This is a fine late Victorian shop front of two floors with a domed corner tower jutting out and overhanging curved verandah roof. Free Renaissance facade treatment with fene	Grahamstown	Albany	Provincial Heritage Site	33°18′28″S 26°31′52″E	Upload Photo
9/2/003/0048	36 High Street, Grahamstown	Originally double storey palazzo design with cornice and parapet. Round headed sash windows and round headed openings to ground floor. Later shopfronts. These two buildings form an integral part of a unique row of semi-detached double-storeyed shops whose façades feature a combination of Free Renaissance, neo-Classical and Georgian styles, blending to form a harmonious architectural feature in High Street Type of site: Commercial Current use: Commercial – Shops. Late Victorian/Edwardian double storey shop, forming part of important grouping.	Grahamstown	Albany	Provincial Heritage Site	33°18′28″S 26°31′52″E	Upload Photo
9/2/003/0049	38 Somerset Street, Grahamstown	Double storey. Double pile plan. Symmetrical corrugated iron roof. Plastered brickwork and stone plinth. Steps. Small pane sash windows. On 1863 map. Building dates from the 1820s. See van der Riet X-12. One of the oldest homes in Grahamstown. Type of site: House Current use: Domestic – House. No 38 Somerset Street is one of the oldest dwellings in Grahamstown, and has been used as the offices of the former Lieutenant Sir Andries Stockenstrom. It retains its historical character and standing as it does at the corner of two important streets.	Grahamstown	Albany	Register	33°18′45″S 26°31′19″E	Upload Photo
9/2/003/0050	Grocott's Mail, 40 High Street, Grahamstown	The building consists of a double storeyed structure with a very flamboyant gabled front, interesting eclectic arches, mock balconies, tall sash windows, entablatures, broken cornice and mouldings and perforate gable. This high Victorian Flemish revival The gable of this impressive building, with its Victorian and Flemish features, bears the dates 1869 to 1906. The present façade was added in 1906 after the devastating fire. This rebuilding was designed by the architect, H Walker. The building forms an i Type of site: Commercial Current use: Commercial – Shops. The gable of this impressive building, with its Victorian and Flemish features, bears the dates 1869 to 1906. The present facade was added in 1906 after the devastating fire. The building forms an integral part of the architectural character of High Street.	Grahamstown	Albany	Provincial Heritage Site	33°18′28″S 26°31′52″E	The building consists of a double storeyed structure with a very flamboyant gabled front, interesting eclectic arches, mock balconies, tall sash windows, entablatures, broken cornice and mouldings and perforate gable. This high Victorian Flemish revival The gable of this impressive building, with its Victorian and Flemish features, bears the dates 1869 to 1906. The present façade was added in 1906 after the devastating fire. This rebuilding was designed by the architect, H Walker. The building forms an i Type of site: Commercial Current use: Commercial – Shops. The gable of this impressive building, with its Victorian and Flemish features, bears the dates 1869 to 1906. The present facade was added in 1906 after the devastating fire. The building forms an integral part of the architectural character of High Street.
9/2/003/0051	46–48 High Street, Grahamstown	Mid Victorian palazzo facade. Simple parapet to cornice. Hood moulds to first floor windows. Later shopfronts and verandah of C1950. These two buildings form an integral part of a unique row of semi-detached double-storeyed shops whose façades feature a combination of Free Renaissance, neo-Classical and Georgian styles, blending to form a harmonious architectural feature in High Street Type of site: Commercial Current use: Commercial – Shops. Late Victorian/Edwardian double storey shop, forming part of important grouping.	Grahamstown	Albany	Provincial Heritage Site	33°18′28″S 26°31′52″E	Upload Photo
9/2/003/0052	50 High Street, Grahamstown	Double-storeyed shop with dressed stone front dating from the 1880s. New facade given height by raised pediment, heavy but elegant cornice and elongated upper windows with arched top sash. A verandah of corrugated iron in accordance with the neighbouring building. These late nineteenth century shops, with their Neo Renaissance façades, form an integral part of the architectural character of High Street, and are an important element in the historical city centre of Grahamstown. Type of site: Commercial Current use: Commercial – Shops. Late Victorian/Edwardian double storey shop, forming part of important grouping.	Grahamstown	Albany	Provincial Heritage Site	33°18′28″S 26°31′52″E	Upload Photo
9/2/003/0053	Trompetter's Drift Fort, Albany District	Trompetter's Drift Tower stands on the bank of the Fish River some 11 km east of the Fraser's Camp. It was not one of the series of signal towers and has its own interesting history. Trompetter's Drift, about 27 kilometres up from the mouth of the Fish Ri Type of site: Military Current use: Farm buildings. Trumpetter's Drift is the most intact of the large forts built on the Eastern Frontier during the 19th century.	Albany	Albany	Provincial Heritage Site	30°13′58″S 26°57′19″E	Trompetter's Drift Tower stands on the bank of the Fish River some 11 km east of the Fraser's Camp. It was not one of the series of signal towers and has its own interesting history. Trompetter's Drift, about 27 kilometres up from the mouth of the Fish Ri Type of site: Military Current use: Farm buildings. Trumpetter's Drift is the most intact of the large forts built on the Eastern Frontier during the 19th century.
9/2/003/0054	Fraser's Camp Signal Tower, Albany District	Fraser's Camp Tower was the next signal tower after Governor's Kop. It stands on the farm Tower Hill to the south of the national road and about 11 km west of the Fish River. In 1835, long before the signal tower was built, Lieutenant-Governor Andries Sto Type of site: Signal Tower Previous use: Signal Tower. Current use: Vacant. Outstanding historical significance. One of only two surviving towers.		Albany	Provincial Heritage Site	33°17′00″S 26°53′30″E	Upload Photo
9/2/003/0056	19 West Street, Grahamstown	DOUBLE STOREY, DOUBLE PILE 5 BAY SYMMETRICAL PLAN. HIPPED CORRUGATED IRON ROOF. WALLS DRESSED STONE. STOEP. ORIGINAL DOOR AND SMALL PANE SASH WINDOWS. PART OF GROUP. BUILDING C1840. SEE N.M.C. FILES. SEE VAN DER RIET V.9. Type of site: House Current use: Domestic – House.	Grahamstown	Albany	Provincial Heritage Site	33°18′45″S 26°31′57″E	Upload Photo
9/2/003/0058	Homestead, Hilton, Albany District	Internally, Hilton has a splendid oval entrance hall in the best classical manner, with wall-niches decorative sculpture and vases. The rooms are high and spacious, with fine fireplaces and the staircase is one of the most gracious surviving in the country. This magnificent double-storeyed bow-fronted Georgian house was erected in 1834 by Richard Gush for the owner Mr A.G. Cumming. Hilton, originally known as Roodedraai, was owned by a butch farmer Philip Schutte, later by Landdrost Rivers. George Cumming b Type of site: House . This magnificent bow-fronted Georgian double-storeyed house was erected in 1834 by Richard Gush for the owner A G Cumming. The bow-fronted design is unique and a few of its kind have remained unaltered.	Hilton	Albany	Provincial Heritage Site	33°46′27″S 26°49′18″E	Upload Photo
9/2/003/0059	Homestead, Devonshire, Albany District	Type of site: House. Built in 1832 by Richard Gush.	Devonshire	Albany	Provincial Heritage Site	33°47′22″S 26°48′59″E	Upload Photo
9/2/003/0061	Old Provost, Lucas Avenue, Grahamstown	It is situated in the grounds of the former drostdy, near the Albany Museum and Botanical Gardens. The cells were arranged in a semicircle. This tower contained quarters for the Provost and a guard-house overlooking the cells, the courtyard and the entrance. The Provost Building was one of the buildings that formed part of Sir Benjamin D’Urban's 1835 defence plan, coupled with the fortification of the drostdy and Fort Selwyn. It was very efficiently planned and was built by the Royal Engineers on instructions.	Grahamstown	Albany	Provincial Heritage Site	33°18′54″S 26°31′11″E	It is situated in the grounds of the former drostdy, near the Albany Museum and Botanical Gardens. The cells were arranged in a semicircle. This tower contained quarters for the Provost and a guard-house overlooking the cells, the courtyard and the entrance. The Provost Building was one of the buildings that formed part of Sir Benjamin D’Urban's 1835 defence plan, coupled with the fortification of the drostdy and Fort Selwyn. It was very efficiently planned and was built by the Royal Engineers on instructions.
9/2/003/0062	Old Methodist Church, Collingham, Albany District	Type of site: Church.	Albany	Albany	Provisional Protection	33°16′10″S 26°38′46″E	Upload Photo
9/2/003/0063	Old Gaol, High Street, Grahamstown	Single storey – single pile plan. Corrugated iron roof. Rough plaster to walls. Sash windows with raised margins. Thich walls to back and side. Like most of the cities and towns of South Africa, Grahamstown grew from modest beginnings. A simple, elongated building in High Street, not far from the Drostdy gateway was one of the first buildings to arise in the town, if indeed it was not the first. Type of site: Gaol Current use: Old Gaol. The erection of the old gaol was commenced in 1813, shortly after the founding of Grahamstown (1812). In 1814 one of the walls of the gaol served as a line for the surveying of the main street, and thus also as the basis for the layout of the whole town.	Grahamstown	Albany	Provincial Heritage Site	33°30′56″S 26°52′00″E	Single storey – single pile plan. Corrugated iron roof. Rough plaster to walls. Sash windows with raised margins. Thich walls to back and side. Like most of the cities and towns of South Africa, Grahamstown grew from modest beginnings. A simple, elongated building in High Street, not far from the Drostdy gateway was one of the first buildings to arise in the town, if indeed it was not the first. Type of site: Gaol Current use: Old Gaol. The erection of the old gaol was commenced in 1813, shortly after the founding of Grahamstown (1812). In 1814 one of the walls of the gaol served as a line for the surveying of the main street, and thus also as the basis for the layout of the whole town.
9/2/003/0064	Mooimeisiesfontein, Riebeeck East, Albany District	The remainder of Erf 193, Riebeeck East, situated in the Municipality of Riebeeck East, Administrative District of Albany. Forty kilometres north-west of Grahamstown, bordering on the village of Riebeek East, lies Mooimeisiesfontein, the well-known farm of Piet Retief. It was in Retief's possession from 1814 to 1836. There he built himself a large house with yellow-wood ceili It is located in close proximity to alicedale currently under promotion by Adrian Gardner of Shamware as a tourist attraction, and nearby Grahamstown. This farmhouse was partially built by Piet Refief. He owned the property from 1814 to 1836.	Riebeeck East	Albany	Provincial Heritage Site	33°12′44″S 26°09′58″E	The remainder of Erf 193, Riebeeck East, situated in the Municipality of Riebeeck East, Administrative District of Albany. Forty kilometres north-west of Grahamstown, bordering on the village of Riebeek East, lies Mooimeisiesfontein, the well-known farm of Piet Retief. It was in Retief's possession from 1814 to 1836. There he built himself a large house with yellow-wood ceili It is located in close proximity to alicedale currently under promotion by Adrian Gardner of Shamware as a tourist attraction, and nearby Grahamstown. This farmhouse was partially built by Piet Refief. He owned the property from 1814 to 1836.
9/2/003/0065	City Hall, 57/59 High Street, Grahamstown	Fine stone tower with concrete dressings. Important city landmark. Facade also in stone. Overall style is early renaissance although there are Gothic touches in the buttresses to the tower. A unique building. DESIGNED NY SIDNEY STENT. THE FOUNDATION STONE WAS LAID IN 1877 AND THE BUILDING OPENED IN 1882. THE BUILDER WAS J.W. ABBOT. SEE VAN DER RIET V1-3. SEE P.1 IN PILOT STUDY. Type of site: City Hall Current use: Public Building – City Hall.	Grahamstown	Albany	Provincial Heritage Site	33°18′28″S 26°31′52″E	Fine stone tower with concrete dressings. Important city landmark. Facade also in stone. Overall style is early renaissance although there are Gothic touches in the buttresses to the tower. A unique building. DESIGNED NY SIDNEY STENT. THE FOUNDATION STONE WAS LAID IN 1877 AND THE BUILDING OPENED IN 1882. THE BUILDER WAS J.W. ABBOT. SEE VAN DER RIET V1-3. SEE P.1 IN PILOT STUDY. Type of site: City Hall Current use: Public Building – City Hall. Media related to Grahamstown Town Hall at Wikimedia Commons
9/2/003/0067	Fort Brown, Albany District	The road northwards to Fort Beaufort, Balfour and the Katberg follows the line of Andrew Geddes Bain's Queens Road to Kaffirland. Fort Brown is reached just before the road crosses the Fish River some 27 km from Grahamstown. This place was originally called Hermanus Kraal after a Hottentot freebooter, Hermanus Xogomesh. It had already acquired this name by 1804 when Commissioner de Mist visited the eastern frontier. Lord Charles Somerset established one of his military posts Type of site: Fort Previous use: Fort. Current use: Vacant. Important Eastern Forntier fortification.	Fort Brown	Albany	Provincial Heritage Site	33°13′00″S 26°01′47″E	The road northwards to Fort Beaufort, Balfour and the Katberg follows the line of Andrew Geddes Bain's Queens Road to Kaffirland. Fort Brown is reached just before the road crosses the Fish River some 27 km from Grahamstown. This place was originally called Hermanus Kraal after a Hottentot freebooter, Hermanus Xogomesh. It had already acquired this name by 1804 when Commissioner de Mist visited the eastern frontier. Lord Charles Somerset established one of his military posts Type of site: Fort Previous use: Fort. Current use: Vacant. Important Eastern Forntier fortification.
9/2/003/0068	Fort Selwyn, Grahamstown	Fort Selwyn stands on Gunfire Hill behind Rhodes University, on land that once belonged to the drostdy. When Sir Benjamin D’Urban had the drostdy site converted into fortified barracks in 1835, it was a part of this defence plan to build forts on the hill to the south of Grahamstown to protect the barracks. The Selwyn Battery, also known as Fort Selwyn, was Type of site: Fort. An important fort which played a pivotal role in the defence of the Eastern Frontier.	Grahamstown	Albany	Provincial Heritage Site	33°19′07″S 26°31′06″E	Fort Selwyn stands on Gunfire Hill behind Rhodes University, on land that once belonged to the drostdy. When Sir Benjamin D’Urban had the drostdy site converted into fortified barracks in 1835, it was a part of this defence plan to build forts on the hill to the south of Grahamstown to protect the barracks. The Selwyn Battery, also known as Fort Selwyn, was Type of site: Fort. An important fort which played a pivotal role in the defence of the Eastern Frontier. Media related to Fort Selwyn at Wikimedia Commons
9/2/003/0069	Truro House, 84 Beaufort Street, Grahamstown	SINGLE STOREY, DOUBLE PILE PLAN. 3 BAY SYMMETRICAL CORE PLUS ADDITION TO RIGHT HAND SIDE. SLATE HIPPED ROOF AND FLAT ROOF TO ADDITIONS. WALLS BRICK PLASTERED. SIGNIFICANT PLASTER DECORATIVE DETAILS. BAY WINDOW PLUS ORIGINAL DOOR AND FRENCH DOORS WITH ON 1863 MAP. THIS BUILDING C1855. SEE N.M.C. FILES. Type of site: House.	Grahamstown	Albany	Provincial Heritage Site	33°19′04″S 26°31′22″E	Upload Photo
9/2/003/0070	Governor's Kop Signal Tower, Albany District	The signal towers were 9 metres high, well fortified and each had two rooms, one above the other, to house the men. Each tower was equipped with signalling apparatus or semaphore of a type which was already in use in France and England. Some of these towers are at regular intervals on the hills east of Graham. These are the signal towers erected in 1843–44. It stands to reason that, apa Type of site: Signal Tower Previous use: Signal Tower. Current use: Vacant. Outstanding historical significance. One of only two surviving towers.		Albany	Provincial Heritage Site	33°16′30″S 26°40′55″E	Upload Photo
9/2/003/0071	Sole Memorial Church, 20 High Street, Grahamstown	Single storey building. Main hall set between stoepkamers. Arched fenestration. Simple pediments and cornice. Brickwork/stonework plastered. Fore court and entrance walls. Originally zinc roofs. Type of site: Church. Erected in 1838 for use as a schoolhouse. Enlarged in 1843. Named after John Henry Sole who devoted most of his life to the advancement of the 'coloured' community of Grahamstown.	Grahamstown	Albany	Provincial Heritage Site	33°18′28″S 26°31′52″E	Upload Photo
9/2/003/0072	1 Sheblon Lane, Grahamstown	SINGLE STOREY, SINGLE PILE L-SHAPED 4 BAY ASYMMETRICAL PLAN. THATCHED ROOF AND WALLS BRICK PLASTERED. ORIGINAL DOOR AND SMALL PANE SASH WINDOWS. SET BACK FROM STREET. NOT ON 1863 MAP. THIS BUILDING c. 1870. SEE R & B REYNOLDS GRAHAMSTOWN FROM COTTAGE TO VILLA P.44 Type of site: House Current use: Domestic – Cottage. These Settler cottages were erected by artisans during the eighteen-twenties on land granted to them by the Government on the understanding that a house of burnt brick or stone be erected within 18 months. Most of the properties were, however, only transferred.	Grahamstown	Albany	Provincial Heritage Site	33°31′21″S 26°53′06″E	Upload Photo
9/2/003/0073	2 Sheblon Lane, Grahamstown	These Settler cottages were erected by artisans during the eighteen-twenties on land granted to them by the Government on the understanding that a house of burnt brick or stone be erected within 18 months. Most of the properties were, however, only transferred. These Settler cottages were erected by artisans during the eighteen-twenties on land granted to them by the Government on the understanding that a house of burnt brick or stone be erected within 18 months.	Grahamstown	Albany	Provincial Heritage Site	33°31′21″S 26°53′06″E	Upload Photo
9/2/003/0074	1 Cross Street, Grahamstown	DOUBLE STOREY, SINGLE PILE L-PLAN. 3 BAY SYMMETRICAL FACADE. SLATE ROOF AND WALLS BRICK PLASTERED. ORIGINAL DOOR AND SMALL PANE SASH WINDOWS. PART OF GROUP. These Settler cottages were erected by artisans during the eighteen-twenties on land granted to them by the Government on the understanding that a house of burnt brick or stone be erected within 18 months. Most of the properties were, however, only transf Type of site: House Current use: Domestic – House.	Grahamstown	Albany	Provincial Heritage Site	33°31′20″S 26°53′07″E	Upload Photo
9/2/003/0075	2 Cross Street, Grahamstown	DOUBLE STOREY, SINGLE PILE, 3 BAY SYMMETRICAL PLAN PLUS ADDITION. SLATE ROOF AND WALLS BRICK PLASTERED. STOEP. ORIGINAL DOOR AND SMALL PANE SASH WINDOWS. This settler cottage was erected by the artisan John Oats during the eighteen-twenties on land granted to him by the Government. The cottage forms part of a unique historical and architectural complex which is closely associated with the British Settlers Type of site: House Current use: Domestic – House. This settler cottage was erected by the artisan John Oats during the eighteen-twenties on land granted to him by the Government.	Grahamstown	Albany	Provincial Heritage Site	33°18′51″S 26°31′46″E	Upload Photo
9/2/003/0076	3 Cross Street, Grahamstown	SINGLE STOREY, DOUBLE PILE 3 BAY SYMMETRICAL PLAN. SLATE ROOF AND WALLS BRICK PLASTERED. SMALL PANE SASH WINDOWS. PART OF GROUP. Type of site: House Current use: Domestic – Cottage. An integral part of an important group of settler buildings.	Grahamstown	Albany	Provincial Heritage Site	33°18′51″S 26°31′46″E	Upload Photo
9/2/003/0077	4 Cross Street, Grahamstown	SINGLE STOREY, DOUBLE PILE L-SHAPED 3 BAY SYMMETRICAL PLAN. SLATE ROOF AND WALLS BRICK PLASTERED. STONE STOEP. ORIGINAL DOOR AND SMALL PANE SASH WINDOWS. ON STREET. PART OF GROUP. These Settler cottages were erected by artisans during the eighteen-twenties on land granted to them by the Government on the understanding that a house of burnt brick or stone be erected within 18 months. Most of the properties were, however, only transf Type of site: House Current use: Domestic – Cottage.	Grahamstown	Albany	Provincial Heritage Site	33°19′01″S 26°31′04″E	Upload Photo
9/2/003/0078	5 Cross Street, Grahamstown	SINGLE STOREY, DOUBLE PILE PLAN. 4 BAY ASYMMETRICAL FACADE. SLATE ROOF AND WALLS BRICK PLASTERED. SMALL PANE SASH WINDOWS. PART OF GROUP. ON 1863 MAP. THIS HOUSE C1830. Type of site: House Current use: Domestic – Cottage. An integral part of an important group of settler buildings.	Grahamstown	Albany	Provincial Heritage Site	33°18′51″S 26°31′46″E	Upload Photo
9/2/003/0079	6 Cross Street, Grahamstown	DOUBLE STOREY, SINGLE PILE L-SHAPED 3 BAY SYMMETRICAL FACADE. CORRUGATED IRON ROOF. WALLS BRICK PLASTERED AND STONE STOEP. ORIGINAL DOOR AND SMALL PANE SASH WINDOWS. ON STREET. PART OF GROUP. These Settler cottages were erected by artisans during the eighteen-twenties on land granted to them by the Government on the understanding that a house of burnt brick or stone be erected within 18 months. Most of the properties were, however, only transf Type of site: House Current use: Domestic – House.	Grahamstown	Albany	Provincial Heritage Site	33°18′51″S 26°31′46″E	Upload Photo
9/2/003/0080	7 Cross Street, Grahamstown	SINGLE STOREY, DOUBLE PILE 3 BAY SYMMETRICAL PLAN. SLATE ROOF. WALLS BRICK PLASTERED. SMALL PANE SASH WINDOWS. PART OF GROUP. ON 1863 MAP. THIS BUILDING C1830. Type of site: House Current use: Domestic – Cottage. An integral part of an important group of settler buildings.	Grahamstown	Albany	Provincial Heritage Site	33°18′51″S 26°31′46″E	Upload Photo
9/2/003/0081	8 Cross Street, Grahamstown	SINGLE STOREY, DOUBLE PILE 3 BAY SYMMETRICAL PLAN. CORRUGATED IRON FLAT ROOF. WALLS BRICK PLASTERED – PARAPET AND CORNICE. STOEP OF STONE. ORIGINAL DOOR AND SMALL PANE SASH WINDOWS. ON STREET AND PART OF GROUP. These Settler cottages were erected by artisans during the eighteen-twenties on land granted to them by the Government on the understanding that a house of burnt brick or stone be erected within 18 months. Most of the properties were, however, only transf Type of site: House Current use: Domestic – Cottage.	Grahamstown	Albany	Provincial Heritage Site	33°18′51″S 26°31′46″E	Upload Photo
9/2/003/0082	9 Cross Street, Grahamstown	SINGLE STOREY, DOUBLE PILE 3 BAY SYMMETRICAL PLAN AND ADDITION TO LEFT-HAND SIDE. FLAT CORRUGATED IRON ROOF. WALLS BRICK PLASTERED AND PARAPET. SMALL PANE SASH WINDOWS – PART OF GROUP. ON 1863 MAP. THIS BUILDING c.1830. Type of site: House Current use: Domestic – Cottage. An integral part of an important group of settler buildings.	Grahamstown	Albany	Provincial Heritage Site	33°18′51″S 26°31′46″E	Upload Photo
9/2/003/0083	10 Cross Street, Grahamstown	Double pile plan shop built with main facade on splay. Corrugated iron flat roof. Walls brick plastered with parapet and cornice. Small pane sash windows and shop windows. On street. These Settler cottages were erected by artisans during the eighteen-twenties on land granted to them by the Government on the understanding that a house of burnt brick or stone be erected within 18 months. Most of the properties were, however, only transf Type of site: House Current use: Commercial – Shop.	Grahamstown	Albany	Provincial Heritage Site	33°18′51″S 26°31′46″E	Double pile plan shop built with main facade on splay. Corrugated iron flat roof. Walls brick plastered with parapet and cornice. Small pane sash windows and shop windows. On street. These Settler cottages were erected by artisans during the eighteen-twenties on land granted to them by the Government on the understanding that a house of burnt brick or stone be erected within 18 months. Most of the properties were, however, only transf Type of site: House Current use: Commercial – Shop.
9/2/003/0084	8A Bartholomew Street, Grahamstown	These Settler cottages were erected by artisans during the eighteen-twenties on land granted to them by the Government on the understanding that a house of burnt brick or stone be erected within 18 months. Most of the properties were, however, only transf Type of site: House	Grahamstown	Albany	Provincial Heritage Site	33°18′27″S 26°31′11″E	Upload Photo
9/2/003/0085	Chapel of St Mary and All the Angels, Rhodes University, Grahamstown	This basilican chapel was built in 1915/16. The foundation stone was laid on 2 June 1915 and the chapel was consecrated by Bishop Phelps on 14 October 1916. The impressive fresco of the Madonna and Child above the altar was painted by Sister Margaret from Type of site: Chapel. This basilican chapel was built in 1915/16. The foundation stone was laid on 2 June 1915 and the chapel was consecrated by Bishop Phelps on 14 October 1916. The impressive fresco of the Madonna and child above the altar was painted by Sister Margaret fr	Grahamstown	Albany	Provincial Heritage Site	33°18′56″S 26°31′19″E	Upload Photo
9/2/003/0086	Trinity Church complex, Hill Street, Grahamstown	Type of site: Church Complex.	Grahamstown	Albany	Provincial Heritage Site	33°31′17″S 26°52′50″E	Upload Photo
9/2/003/0086/001	Trinity Church cottage, 55 Hill Street, Grahamstown	In neo-classical style. Corrugated iron roof. Walls brick plastered. Double storey, 3 bay, asymmetrical plan and small porch. Built C1840 Type of site: House Current use: House.	Grahamstown	Albany	Provincial Heritage Site	33°18′26″S 26°31′27″E	Upload Photo
9/2/003/0086/002	Trinity Church Hall, 57 Hill Street, Grahamstown	In Neo-Classical style. Corrugated iron roof. Walls brick plastered. Parapeted front. Built 1859 Type of site: Church Hall Current use: Church Hall.	Grahamstown	Albany	Provincial Heritage Site	33°18′25″S 26°31′27″E	Upload Photo
9/2/003/0086/003	Trinity Church, 59 Hill Street, Grahamstown	In Neo-Classical style. Corrugated iron roof. Walls brick plastered. Parapet front and projecting temple porch. Built 1840–42 Type of site: Church Current use: Religious – Church.	Grahamstown	Albany	Provincial Heritage Site	33°18′25″S 26°31′27″E	Upload Photo
9/2/003/0087	48–50 Bathurst Street, Grahamstown	DOUBLE STOREY. FIVE BAY DOUBLE PILE PLAN. CORRUGATED IRON FLAT ROOF. BRICKWORK PLASTERED. PARAPET AND CORNICE. ASHLAR TO FRONT FACADE. SMALL PANE SASH WINDOWS. ON 1863 MAP. BUILDING c.1850? SEE VAN DER RIET V111-22 AND 23. Type of site: Commercial / Residential Current use: Commercial – Shops.	Grahamstown	Albany	Provincial Heritage Site	33°18′41″S 26°31′49″E	Upload Photo
9/2/003/0088	21 West Street, Grahamstown	DOUBLE STOREY, DOUBLE PILE 5 BAY SYMMETRICAL PLAN. HIPPED CORRUGATED IRON ROOF. WALLS: STONE, PLASTERED. STOEP. ORIGINAL DOOR AND UNEQUAL SMALL PANE SASH WINDOWS. PART OF GROUP. BUILDING c. 1840. SEE N.M.C. FILES. SEE VAN DER RIET V.9. Type of site: House Current use: Domestic – House.	Grahamstown	Albany	Provincial Heritage Site	33°18′45″S 26°31′57″E	Upload Photo
9/2/003/0089	Alms Houses, 21–23 Lawrence Street, Grahamstown	Single storey – two units each three bay symmetrical single pile plan plus wing. Front stoep. Slate roof. Front stone walls and side brick plastered hood moulds to windows. Steel windows. Original front doors. On street. BUILT SAME TIME AS SCHOOL ROOM? Type of site: House Current use: Domestic – House.	Grahamstown	Albany	Provincial Heritage Site	33°31′34″S 26°53′07″E	Upload Photo
9/2/003/0090	Old St Bartholomew's Church school, Bartholomew Street, Grahamstown	Single storey single space classroom. Symmetrical. Corrugated iron roof. Dressed stone walls. Hood moulds to wooden casement windows. BUILT 1863? NOT ON 1863 MAP. Type of site: School Current use: Institutional – School. Erected in 1866 as a boys' school.	Grahamstown	Albany	Provincial Heritage Site	33°31′04″S 26°53′06″E	Upload Photo
9/2/003/0091	Pillar box, Worcester Street, Grahamstown	This pillar box, as situated above, belongs to one of the earliest documented British made post boxes, the fluted type supplied in 1857. This was one of 19 distinct types of pillar boxes supplied to the British post office in the period, 1852 to 1859. Type of site: Post Box, Railway Station. This pillar box, belongs to one of the earliest documented British made post boxes, the fluted type supplied in 1857.	Grahamstown	Albany	Provincial Heritage Site	33°18′28″S 26°31′03″E	This pillar box, as situated above, belongs to one of the earliest documented British made post boxes, the fluted type supplied in 1857. This was one of 19 distinct types of pillar boxes supplied to the British post office in the period, 1852 to 1859. Type of site: Post Box, Railway Station. This pillar box, belongs to one of the earliest documented British made post boxes, the fluted type supplied in 1857.
9/2/003/0092	Upper Croft, Salem, Albany District	Type of site: House. Double storeyed Georgian style house. Built in the 1830s.	Salem	Albany	Provincial Heritage Site	33°46′27″S 26°49′14″E	Type of site: House. Double storeyed Georgian style house. Built in the 1830s.
9/2/003/0093	Hill Organ, Grahamstown, Methodist Church, Grahamstown	The organ measures 3 metres high, 2 metres wide and one metre from front to back. It has a single manual of 58 notes, twelve pedals, eight registers and one swell pedal lever. The blowing is done by hand, the blowing lever projecting some distance before This Organ was made by William Hill, London, between 1832 and 1837. It was imported by Major Henry Somerset as a present for his wife. She gave it to the Chapel in Fort England, from where it was transferred to the Methodist Church, Grahamstown. This organ was made by William Hill, London, between 1832 and 1837. It was imported by Major Henry Somerset as a present to his wife. She gave it to the chapel in Fort England, from where it was transferred to the Methodist Church, Grahamstown in 1914.	Grahamstown	Albany	Heritage Object	33°30′11″S 26°48′29″E	Upload Photo
9/2/003/0094	Tryall Cottage, 19 Somerset Street, Grahamstown		Grahamstown	Albany	Provincial Heritage Site	33°18′29″S 26°31′06″E	Upload Photo
9/2/003/0095	Corbelled hut, Spring Farm, Albany District	This corbelled hut is an excellent example of the ingenuity of the early pioneers in building a house with the only material at their disposal and is therefore an important link in the development of vernacular architecture in South Africa. Type of site: Kiln Current use: Vacant. This corbelled hut is an excellent example of the ingenuity of the early pioneers in building a house with the only material at their disposal and is therefore an important link in the development of vernacular architecture in South Africa.	Spring Farm	Albany	Provincial Heritage Site	33°29′47″S 26°34′02″E	Upload Photo
9/2/003/0096	Corbelled huts, Glenfield, Albany District	Type of site: Corbelled House Current use: Vacant. The origins of these structures are uncertain.	Glenfield	Albany	Provincial Heritage Site	33°29′47″S 26°34′02″E	Upload Photo
9/2/003/0115	8 Bartholomew Street, Grahamstown	SINGLE STOREY, DOUBLE PILE 5 BAY ASYMMETRICAL PLAN. CORRUGATED IRON ROOF AND WALLS BRICK PLASTERED. ORIGINAL DOOR AND LARGE PANE SASH WINDOWS. ON STREET. ON 1863 MAP – SLIGHTLY DIFFERENT FORM. BUILDING c.1830. Type of site: House Current use: Domestic – Cottage.	Grahamstown	Albany	Provincial Heritage Site	33°18′27″S 26°31′11″E	Upload Photo
9/2/003/0119-002	54–56 High Street, Grahamstown	Triple bay facade. Strong cornice and parapet. Heavy pilasters. Round arched windows with segmental arched shopfronts below- originally. Later cast iron verandah. This building which dates from the early 1860s is double-storeyed with elongated upper These late nineteenth century shops, with their Neo Renaissance façades, form an integral part of the architectural character of High Street, and are an important element in the historical city centre of Grahamstown. Type of site: Commercial Current use: Commercial – Shops. Late Victorian/Edwardian double storey shop, forming part of important grouping.	Grahamstown	Albany	Provincial Heritage Site	33°18′28″S 26°31′52″E	Upload Photo
9/2/003/0119-003	58–60 High Street, Grahamstown	Simple cornice with five bay facade below. Broken hoods to windows plus belt courses. Ground floor altered and later cast iron verandah. These late nineteenth century shops, with their Neo Renaissance façades, form an integral part of the architectural character of High Street, and are an important element in the historical city centre of Grahamstown. Type of site: Commercial Current use: Commercial – Shops. Late Victorian/Edwardian double storey shop, forming part of important grouping.	Grahamstown	Albany	Provincial Heritage Site	33°18′28″S 26°31′10″E	Upload Photo
