= Josie Wood =

South African educator involved in learning for the blind

Josephine Ethel "Josie" Wood (22 January 1874 – 4 April 1965) was a South African educator, co-founder of the South African Library for the Blind and the South African National Council for the Blind.

== Early life ==
Josephine Ethel Wood was born in Grahamstown, the daughter of George Samuel Wood and Frances Elizabeth Hoole Wood. Her father was the first mayor of Grahamstown. Josie attended the Diocesan School for Girls, Grahamstown and studied to be a teacher. In 1918, while volunteering as a nurse during the worldwide influenza pandemic, she met Eleanor Comber, an English nurse missionary who brought a collection of braille books to lend to blind patients. Comber persuaded Wood to take over her work when Comber left South Africa in 1919.

== Career ==
From her own home at first, Josie Wood maintained the lending library of braille materials, a list of borrowers, and the materials for mailing the books. She was the library's primary fundraiser, selling her own art to support the project. Soon she was commissioning braille transcriptions of more works for her patrons, and sending abroad for donations of money and books. She established a long-running relationship with the National Library for the Blind in London. She arranged favorable shipping deals with carriers of the braille materials, and eventually with the postal service.

A new building ("Bannerman Building") and hired staff were added by 1925, when the South African Library for the Blind was officially opened in Grahamstown. Wood was the Library's honorary secretary from that time until her death 42 years later. During her tenure, the library's holdings expanded to include recorded texts and the machines required for their use. In 1929, she co-founded the South African National Council for the Blind (SANCB), and in 1952 became the Council's first honorary life president. In 1961, the South African Library Association recognized her as an Honorary Fellow, and she wrote the "President's Message" in the first issue of Imfama, the South African magazine for blind people. In 1963, her lifetime of service was recognized with the first R. W. Bowen Medal from the SANCB.

== Personal life and legacy ==
Wood died in 1965, aged 91 years. In 1966, the Josie Wood Wing of the South African Library for the Blind was dedicated in her memory. There is a The Josie Wood Trust Fund for the South African Library for the Blind, which funds programs in literacy for blind children and youth.
