= Maria Wilman =

South African botanist (1867–1957)

- Born: 29 April 1867; Beaufort West, Cape colony
- Died: 9 November 1957 (aged 90); George, Cape Province, South Africa
- Education: University of Cambridge
- Awards: Honorary Doctor of Laws(LLD), University of the Witwatersrand (1939)
- Scientific career
- Fields: Botany; Geology
- Workplaces: McGregor Museum, Iziko South African Museum

Maria Wilman (29 April 1867 – 9 November 1957) was a South African geologist and botanist. She was the first Director of the McGregor Museum in Kimberley, South Africa and the second female South African to attend the University of Cambridge in England.

Wilman maintained a lifelong interest in botany, establishing both a museum garden and a rock garden within the Kimberley Public Gardens. She published extensively on the flora of Griqualand West, including her key work, ''Preliminary Checklist of the Flowering Plants and Ferns of Griqualand West'' (1946). she was a member of several prominent scientific organisations, including the South African Philosophical Society and its successor, the Royal Society of South Africa.

== Early life ==
Born in Beaufort West on 29 April 1867, Wilman was the fifth of Herbert Wilman and Engela Johanna Neethling's nine daughters. Her father was an immigrant to South Africa from Yorkshire and served as an MP for Beaufort West in the Cape Parliament of Prime Minister John Molteno.

== Education ==
Wilman first matriculated at the Good Hope Seminary in Cape Town. Later, in 1885, she entered the University of Cambridge and was only the second South African woman to do so. She completed a natural science tripos in geology, mineralogy, and chemistry at Newnham College, Cambridge in 1888, and an MA in botany in 1895. However, women were not conferred formal degrees until the 1930s, so Wilman did not actually receive her MA from Cambridge until November 1931.

In 1939 she was granted an honorary doctorate in law from the University of the Witwatersrand in Johannesburg.

== On the staff of the South African Museum ==
Wilman's museum career began when she returned to South Africa from England and worked as a volunteer in the Geology Department at the South African Museum in Cape Town. Because she did not have a formal degree and her father did not approve of her earning a salary, Wilman was unable to accept payment for her work at the museum. Nonetheless, she continued to work there in a volunteer capacity until 1902 when she was officially named an assistant in the Geology Department.

While at the South African Museum, Wilman worked with Louis Albert Péringuey. Péringuey's interest in the San people and culture allowed her to take several research trips to the Northern Cape and Zimbabwe.

In 1906 she undertook an important journey up to Kimberley, the Vryburg region and further north, collecting specimens, and amassing data on rock engravings which was the start of a project culminating nearly three decades later in her publication Rock engravings of Griqualand West and Bechuanaland (1933), published in Cambridge. It remained the standard text on rock art in South Africa for nearly five decades.

Wilman continued to study rock art, as well as the culture of the San and Khoikhoi peoples for the rest of her life.

== Director of the McGregor Museum in Kimberley ==
Wilman was appointed as the first Director of the newly founded McGregor Museum in Kimberley in 1908. She also founded the herbarium there in the same year and began to cultivate its collection of regional plant life, which includes important type specimens from Northern Cape. She fostered relationships with local collectors on specimens, like Constance Georgina Adams, with whom she developed a long term friendship.

Her botanical work at the McGregor led to her publication Preliminary Checklist of the Flowering Plants and Ferns of Griqualand West (1946). She also introduced mesquite and kurrajong trees to Kimberley and shared South African grass seeds with institutions and organisations in the United States. Some have attributed these grass species with resuscitating some of the Dust Bowl areas in the country, particular in the state of Texas.

Wilman stepped down from the directorship of the McGregor in 1947, but continued to work on her geology and botany studies there. She retired from the museum completely in 1953 and went to live in George. Wilman died there on 9 November 1957. She had never married.

== Legacy ==
Several plant species have been named in her honour, including Wilman lovegrass (Eragrostis superb), Watsonia wilmaniae, Stapelia wilmaniae, Ruschia wilmaniae, Hereroa wilmaniae, and Nananthus wilmaniae.
