= Good Shepherd School, Grahamstown =

Good Shepherd School

Location
- 33°18′45.7″S 26°31′31.8″E

Information
- Religious affiliation: Anglican
- Established: 1 October 1884
- Founder: Mother Cecile of Grahamstown

The Good Shepherd School in Grahamstown, Eastern Cape, South Africa is a public school on private property providing education for boys and girls from grade 1 to grade 7.

== History ==
The school was established by Mother Cecile of Grahamstown in October 1884 (though not in its present premises). Mother Cecile was the founder of the Community of the Resurrection of our Lord (also known as the CR Sisters). In 1918, the CR Sisters purchased the current building in Huntley Street, and the Good Shepherd School moved into its current home.

The Huntley Street Building was built in 1844, and was—from 1849—the St. George's Grammar School. St. George's Grammar School was founded by Robert Gray, Bishop of Cape Town. F. Bankes, a priest, was the first headmaster; he later became the first headmaster of St. Andrew's College.

The school is situated near the centre of the city's business area. In spite of this, the school is populated predominantly by disadvantaged learners. The school's medium of instruction is English. The school caters for girls and boys from grade 1 to 7 (ages 6– 13).

== Recent developments ==
Through funds secured from PetroSA in 2010, the new classroom block was built and the administration block totally refurbished to provide for a staff room, library, computer lab, kitchen (from where the school nutrition programme is run), and a meeting room.

Good Shepherd School is an Anglican school. As a Public School on Private Property, the Good Shepherd Trust has stewardship of the school buildings and property.

== Note and references ==
- Joe Wagner (11 September 2014). "Book hand-over at Good Shepherd Primary". Grocott's Mail. Archived from the original on 2014-10-23.
- Nolubabalo Yantolo (10 October 2014). "Historic School Event". Grocott's Mail. Grahamstown. p. 13 col A.
- "Good Shepherd School celebrates 130th Birthday". St. Andrew's College, Grahamstown. 16 October 2014. Archived from the original on 22 October 2014.
- "PetroSA revamps one of South Africa's oldest school's for R9 million" (Press release). PetroSA. 23 April 2010.
- de Henningsen, Amelia (1989). The reminiscences of Amelia de Henningsen: notre mère. Maskew Miller Longman. ISBN 978-0-636-01256-1.
