= Albany Museum, South Africa =

Museum in South Africa

Coordinates: 33.313432°S 26.521896°E

Albany Museum
- Established: 1860
- Location: Grahamstown, South Africa
- Website: Albany Museum

The Albany Museum, South Africa, situated in Makhanda, South Africa, is affiliated to Rhodes University and dates back to 1855, making it the second oldest museum in South Africa.

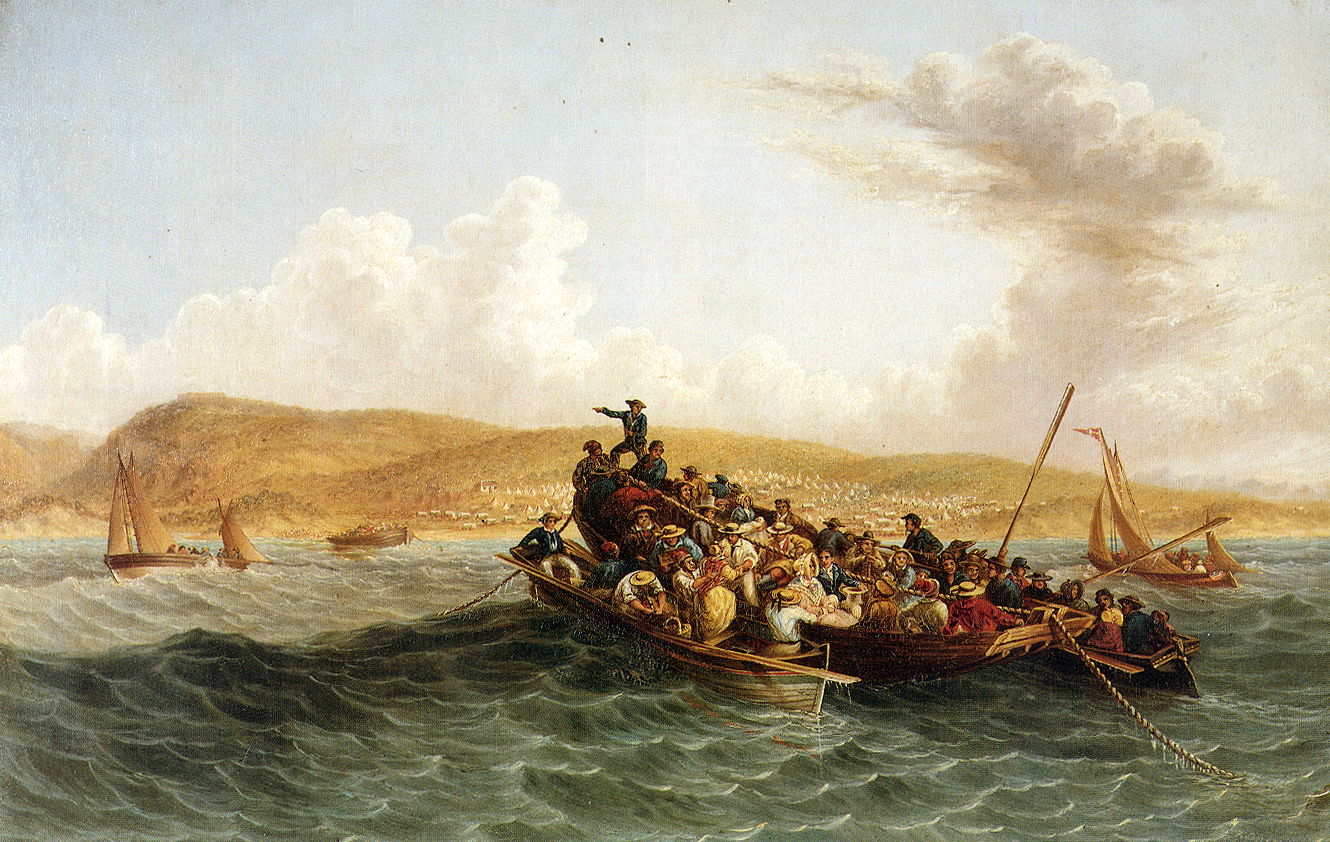
The British Settlers of 1820 Landing in Algoa Bay by Thomas Baines (Albany Museum)

The natural history and geology collections of the Eastern Province Literary, Scientific and Medical Society were used as its nucleus. The herbarium is staffed by the South African National Biodiversity Institute and has material dating back to 1812, collected by William John Burchell, and a collection of 240 specimens donated by Constance Georgina Adams in 1919, as well as geological material gathered by Andrew Geddes Bain and W. G. Atherstone. It also houses a large collection of invertebrate, vertebrate and tetrapod fossils (some of which are from the world renowned Waterloo Farm lagerstätte), and palaeolithic stone tools discovered by Thomas Holden Bowker (1808–1885) near the Great Fish River.

The Museum currently is spread over seven buildings housing the Natural Sciences Museum, the History Museum, the Observatory Museum, Fort Selwyn, the Old Provost military prison, Drostdy Arch and the Old Priest's House.

The first curator was B. J. Glanville, who acted in an honorary capacity between 1855 and 1882. Then a small stipend was offered and the position was taken by Mary Glanville until 1888 when S. Mundy, a temporary curator took over and was replaced by Selmar Schonland in 1889. Schonland filled the post until 1910 and handed the reins to John Hewitt who managed the museum for an extraordinarily long term from 1910 to 1958. He was succeeded by T. H. Barry, appointed Director of the South African Museum in Cape Town in 1964 and was in turn followed in 1965 by the entomologist Charles Frédéric Jacot-Guillarmod (the husband of Amy Jacot Guillarmod), until 1977. Mr B Wilmot was confirmed as curator from 1977 to 1993, Mr W Holleman from 193 to 1999, and Dr L Webley from 1999.

== Sources ==
- SESA, vol. 1
