= South African Library for the Blind =

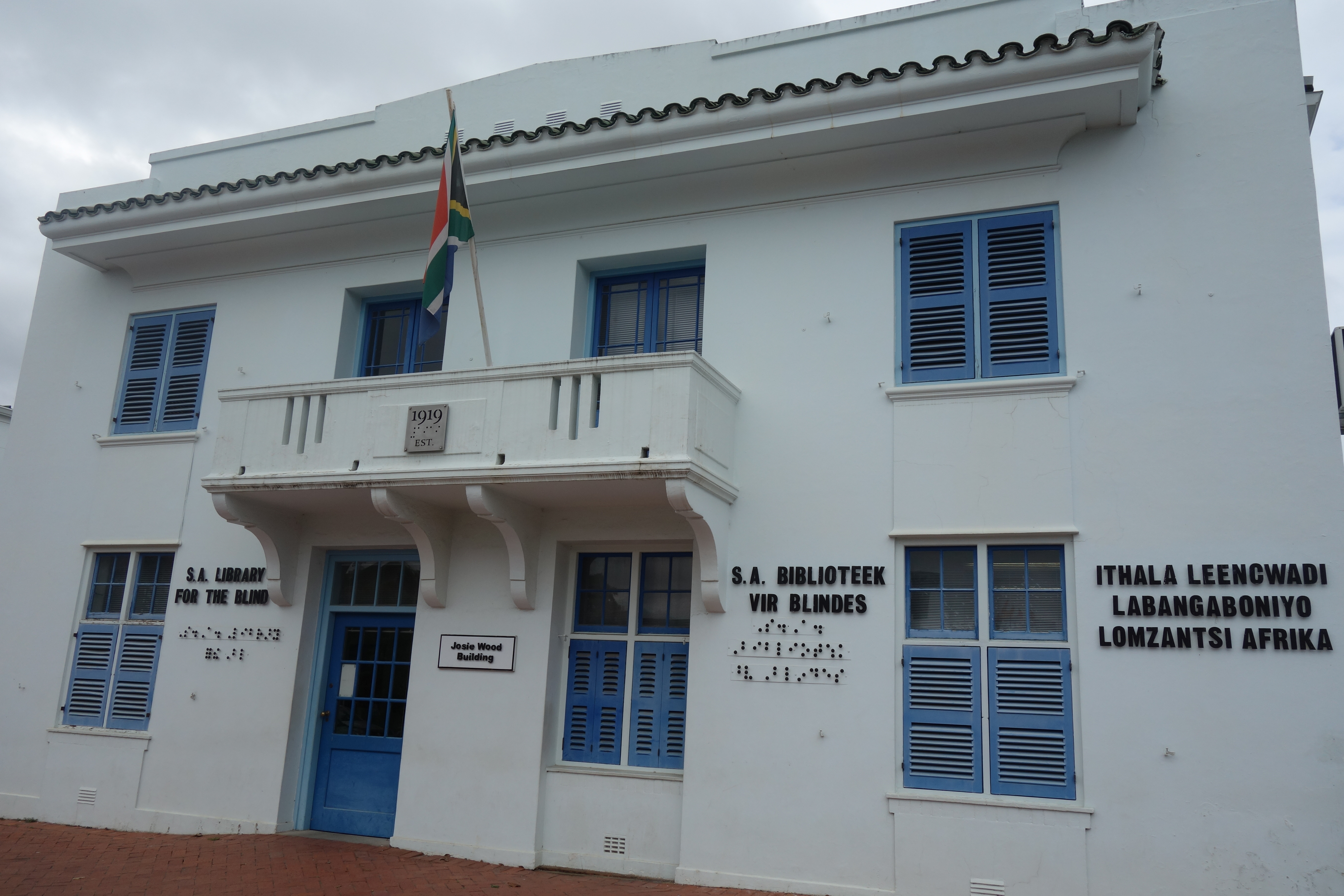
- 33.311988520783345°S 26.525030959082585°E
- Location: Grahamstown, South Africa
- Established: 1923

Other information
- Website: https://www.salb.org.za/

The South African Library for the Blind (SALB) is a statutory body with the objective to provide a national library and information service to serve blind and print-disabled readers in South Africa.

== History ==
The South African Library for the Blind (SALB) was established in 1923. It originated, in 1918/1919, from a private collection of 100 braille volumes collected by Miss Comber, a British nurse. On her recall to England in 1919, Miss Comber requested that Josie Wood make accessible these materials. Josie Wood accepted the offer and housed the materials in a room in her house in Grahamstown. This collection and the services based on it grew to form the South African Library for the Blind (SALB). In 1930, a grant received from the Carnegie Corporation of New York (CCNY) allowed for a building to be purchased to permanently house the collections and services. The grant was awarded on the condition that all library services for visually impaired persons in South Africa be centralised.

In 1969, the South African Library for the Blind became one of South Africa's three national libraries. The SALB is a government-funded institution with a membership base of more than 4000 members worldwide.

== Vision ==
"The South African Library for the Blind is the leading library in Africa providing equal access to information in accessible formats that improves the quality of life of blind and visually impaired people."

== Mission ==
"The South African Library for the Blind renders a library and information service to blind and visually impaired people through the production of accessible South African reading material in development of a comprehensive library collection and rendering of advisory services to promote access to information."

== Services ==
The SALB provides reading materials in formats that will allow persons with relevant disabilities to be able to access the content of these materials. These services also include circulation of materials to members

== Membership ==
The South African Library for the Blind is a member of the following organisations:

- DAISY Consortium

== Legislation ==
- South African Library for the Blind Act 91 of 1998
- South African Library for the Blind Act, 1998 - Regulations
- Marrakesh Treaty to Facilitate Access to Published Works for Persons Who Are Blind, Visually Impaired or Otherwise Print Disabled
