= Francis Isherwood =

England international rugby union player & cricketer

- Born: Francis William Ramsbottom Isherwood; 16 October 1851 Reading, Berkshire, England
- Died: 30 April 1888 (aged 36) Southsea, Hampshire

Rugby union career
- Position: Forward
International career
Years	Team	Apps	(Points)
1872	England	1	(1)

Francis William Ramsbottom Isherwood (16 October 1851 – 30 April 1888) was an English sportsman who played international rugby union for England and first-class cricket.

Francis Isherwood was the third son of Richard Ramsbottom Isherwood of Clewer Lodge and Reading, both in Berkshire, and his wife, Anna Clarendon, the daughter of William Cox of Windsor in New South Wales, Australia. Annie Isherwood, Anglican nun and founder of the Community of the Resurrection of our Lord, was his younger sister. He was educated at Rugby School and Brasenose College, Oxford.

Isherwood made his only appearance for England in game against Scotland at Kennington Oval in 1872. His conversion helped England to a 2–1 win.

He also played five first-class cricket matches in 1872, as a fast-medium round arm bowler. His first match was for the Marylebone Cricket Club against Oxford University, but his four other first-class games were for Oxford.

Five of his seven career wickets were taken in the one match, against the Gentlemen of England, including a return of 4/52 in the first innings. His nephew, Lionel Isherwood, played first-class cricket in the 1920s.
