= Lionel Isherwood =

English cricketer & soldier (1891–1970)

Personal information
- Full name: Lionel Charlie Ramsbottom-Isherwood
- Born: 13 April 1891; Southsea, Hampshire, England
- Died: 30 September 1970 (aged 79); Merrow, Surrey, England
- Batting: Right-handed
- Bowling: Right-arm medium
- Relatives: Francis Isherwood (uncle)

Domestic team information
- Years: Team
- 1919-1923: Hampshire
- 1923-1926/27: Marylebone Cricket Club
- 1925-1927: Sussex

Career statistics
Competition	First-class
Matches	60
Runs scored	1,529
Batting average	16.44
100s/50s	–/6
Top score	75*
Balls bowled	60
Wickets	1
Bowling average	24.00
5 wickets in innings	–
10 wickets in match	–
Best bowling	1/16
Catches/stumpings	1/–
- Source: Cricinfo, 12 December 2009

Lionel Charlie Ramsbottom-Isherwood (13 April 1891 — 30 September 1970) was an English first-class cricketer and an officer in the British Army.

== Military service and cricket career ==
The only son of Charles Edward Ramsbottom-Isherwood and his wife, Isabel, he was born at Southsea in April 1891. He was educated at Eton College, and following the completion of his education he was commissioned as a probationary second lieutenant into the Royal Field Artillery in August 1910. He was confirmed as a second lieutenant in September 1911, prior to transferring to the 16th Lancers in 1912. Isherwood served in the First World War with the 16th Lancers, being promoted to lieutenant in December 1914. He was seconded to the staff in January 1918, at which point he was granted the temporary rank of captain. He gained the full rank of captain after the war, in January 1920, and was seconded to be the adjutant of the Sherwood Rangers Yeomanry in April 1920. His appointment in the Yeomanry lasted until August 1922.

Following the war, Isherwood played first-class cricket for Hampshire, making his debut against Gloucestershire at Bristol in the 1919 County Championship. He played first-class cricket for Hampshire until 1923, making 26 appearances, the majority (15) of which came in 1921. In his 26 matches for Hampshire, he scored 627 runs at an average of 16.50; he made three half centuries, with a highest score of 61 not out. In 1923, he also played two first-class matches for the Marylebone Cricket Club (MCC) against Oxford and Cambridge Universities. He joined Sussex in 1925, making his debut against Leicestershire at Hove in the 1925 County Championship. He played for the county until 1927, making 28 appearances. For Sussex, he scored 787 runs at an average of 16.74; he made three half centuries, with a highest score of 75 not out. While playing for Sussex, Isherwood made a further four first-class appearances for the MCC against Argentina on their late 1926 winter tour of South America. Overall in first-class cricket, he played 60 matches and scored 1,529 runs at an average of 16.44. He was described by John Arlott as a "conscientious, careful batsman with limited strokes, but much patience".

Isherwood would later serve in the Second World War as a war substantive major with the Royal Armoured Corps, until his retirement in November 1945, shortly after the end of the war. Upon his retirement, he was granted the honorary rank of lieutenant colonel. Isherwood died in September 1970 at Merrow, Surrey. His uncle was the first-class cricketer and rugby union international Francis Isherwood.
