= Grocott's Mail =

Coordinates: 33°18′35″S 26°31′41″E

Grocott’s Mail
- Founder: Thomas Henry Grocott
- Founded: 1870
- Language: English
- City: Grahamstown
- Country: South Africa
- Website: grocotts.ru.ac.za

Grocott’s Mail is the oldest surviving independent newspaper in South Africa. Founded in 1870 (but incorporating the Grahamstown Journal which was founded in 1831), this weekly newspaper has survived many years and is today the only newspaper that is published in Grahamstown.

== Founding ==
Thomas Henry Grocott was the founder of Grocott’s Free Paper, established on 7 May 1870 from premises in High Street, which is a listed heritage site. The gable of the building, with its Victorian and Flemish features, bears the date 1869-1906, while the present façade was added in 1906 after a devastating fire.

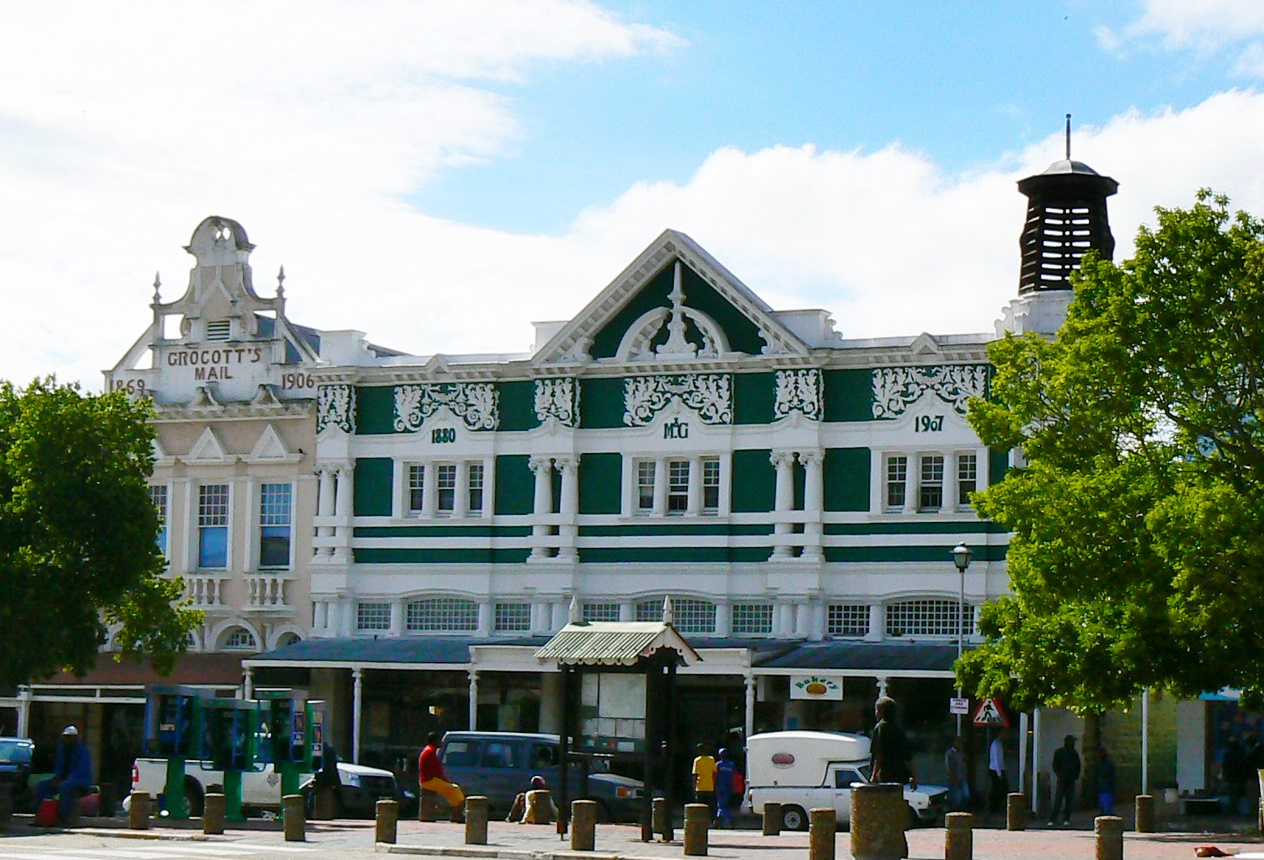
Grahamstown Grocotts Mail

== Twentieth century ==
In 1920, Grocott and Sherry bought out the Grahamstown Journal and the two publishers decided to issue a single daily edition due to the post war paper shortage.

In 1965, the newspaper was published biweekly on Tuesdays and Fridays. Since 2013, the paper is published on Fridays only.

== Recent history ==
Grocott’s Mail was acquired by a Rhodes University-linked company in 2003. The broad objective of the acquisition is to ensure the survival of Grocott’s Mail and to use it for the teaching of journalism students at the university. Rhodes journalism students, working under supervision, provide stories, photographs and designs to readers. Named in honour of a former journalist, the company is known as the David Rabkin Project for Experimental Journalism. Rhodes intends that Grocott's Mail will remain a community newspaper for the whole city and its surrounds.
