= Makhanda, South Africa =

Makhanda Grahamstown
- Town
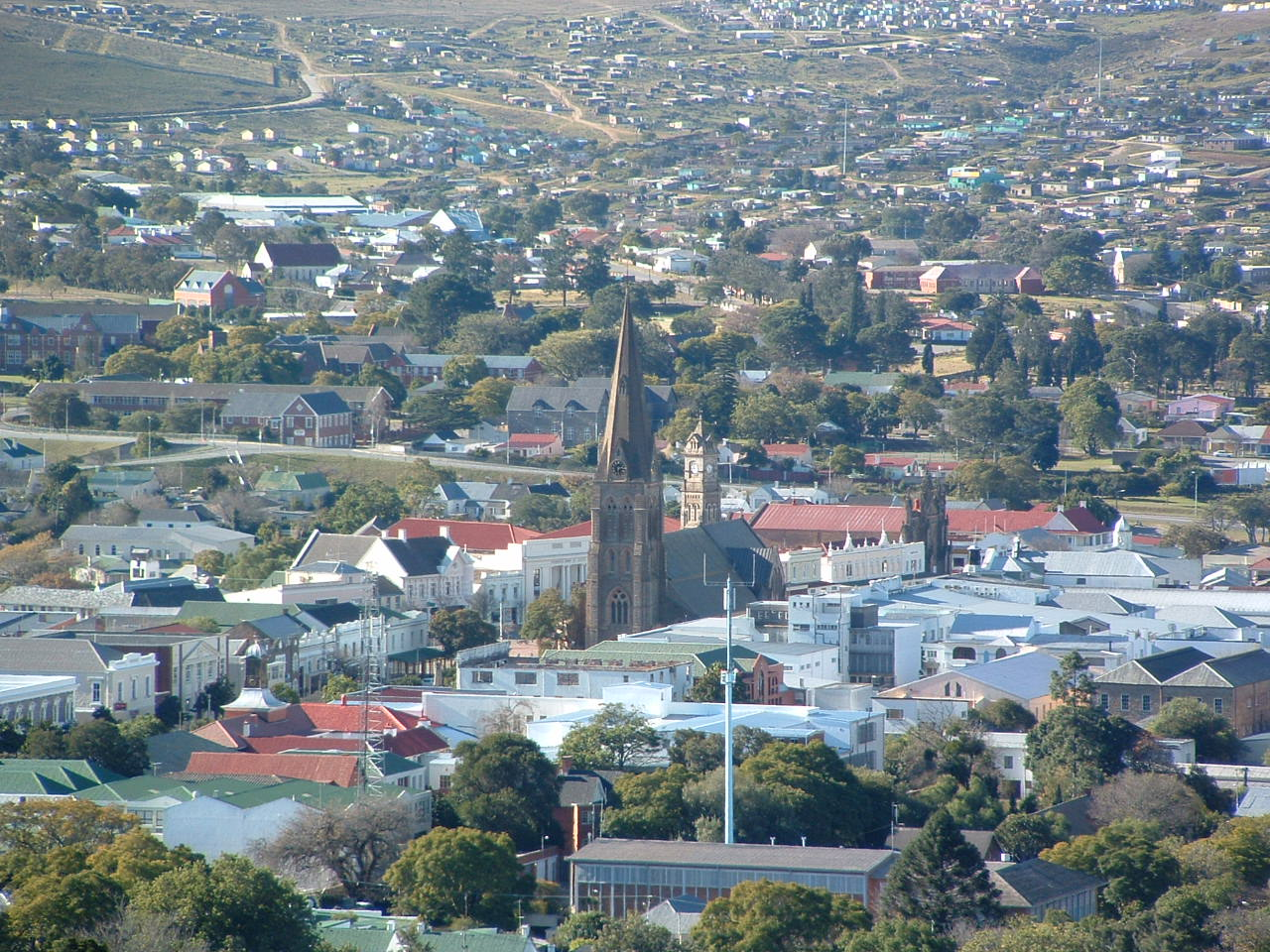
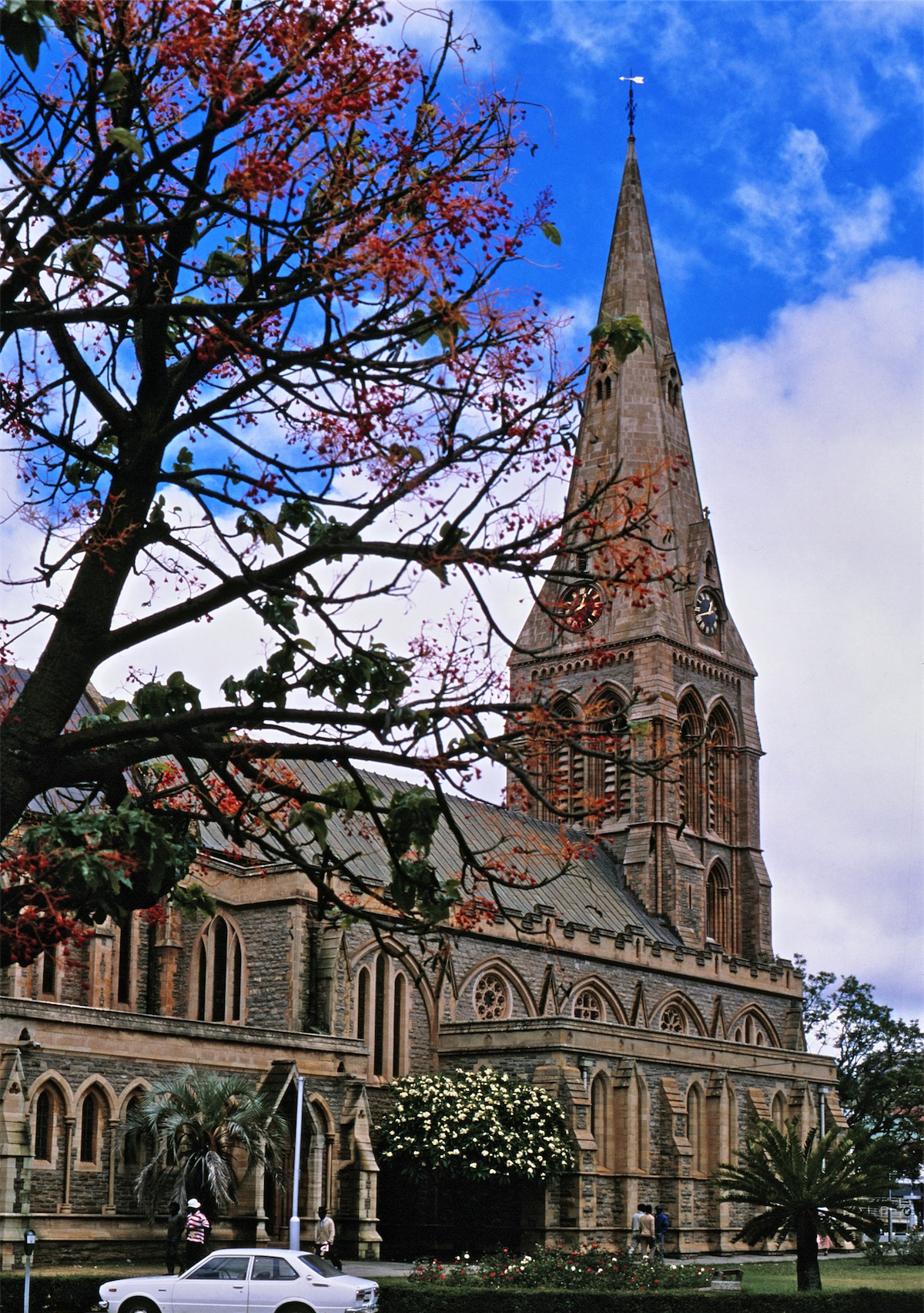
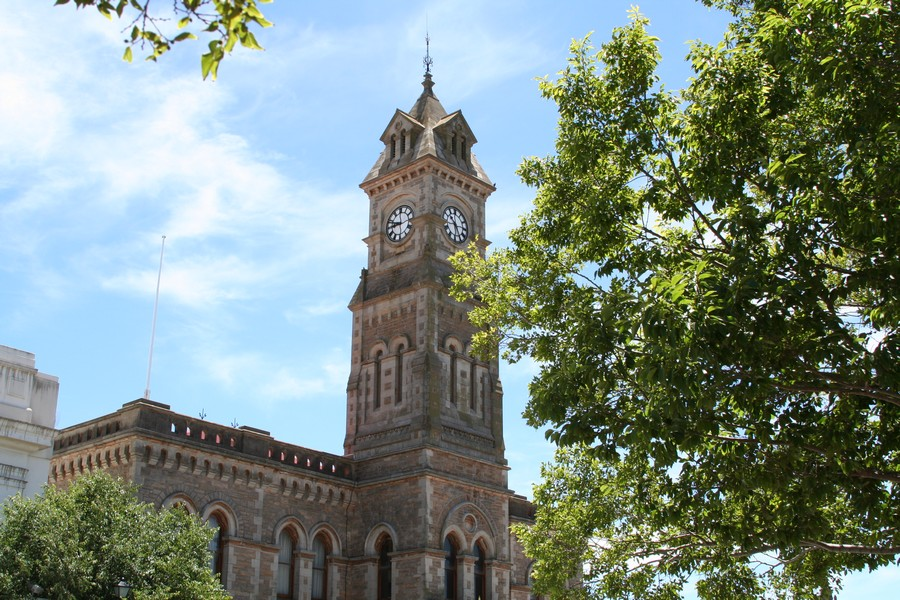
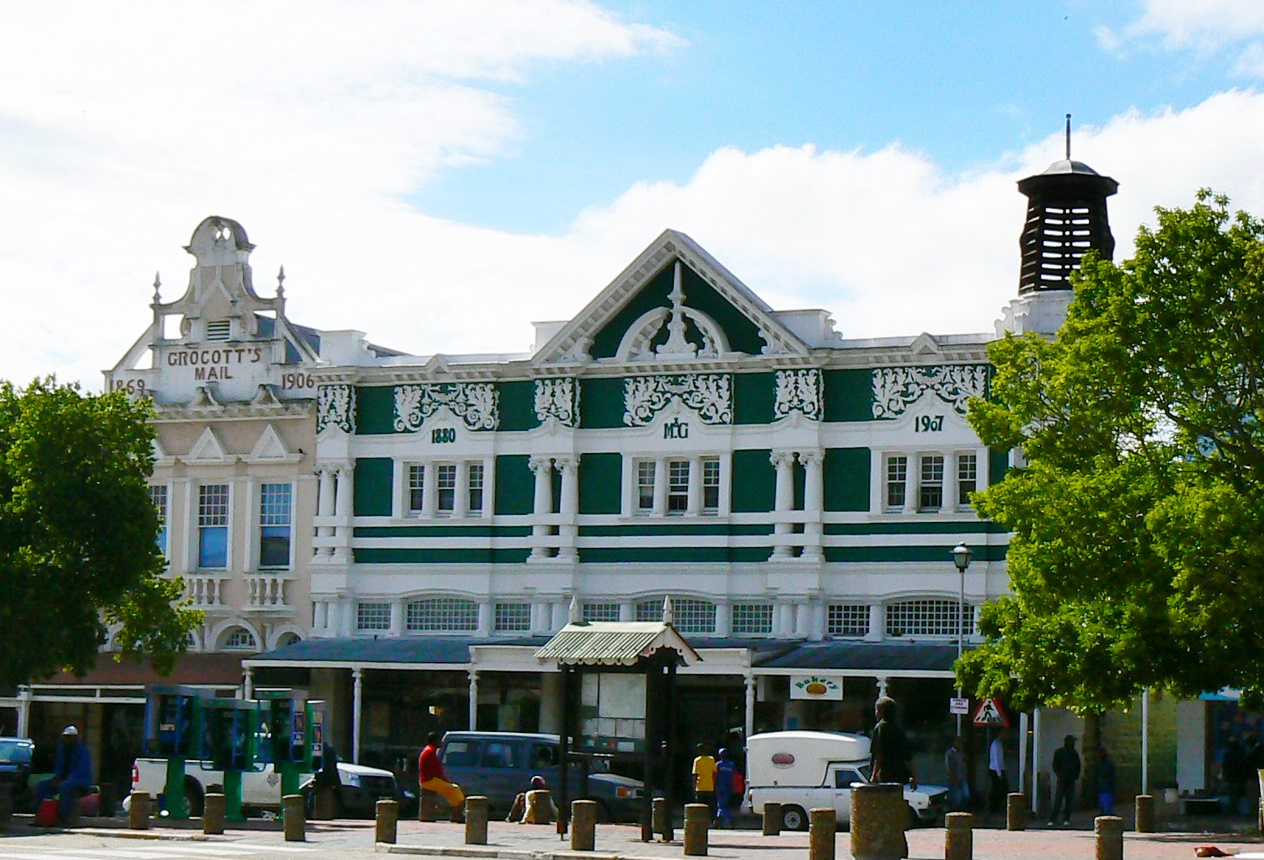
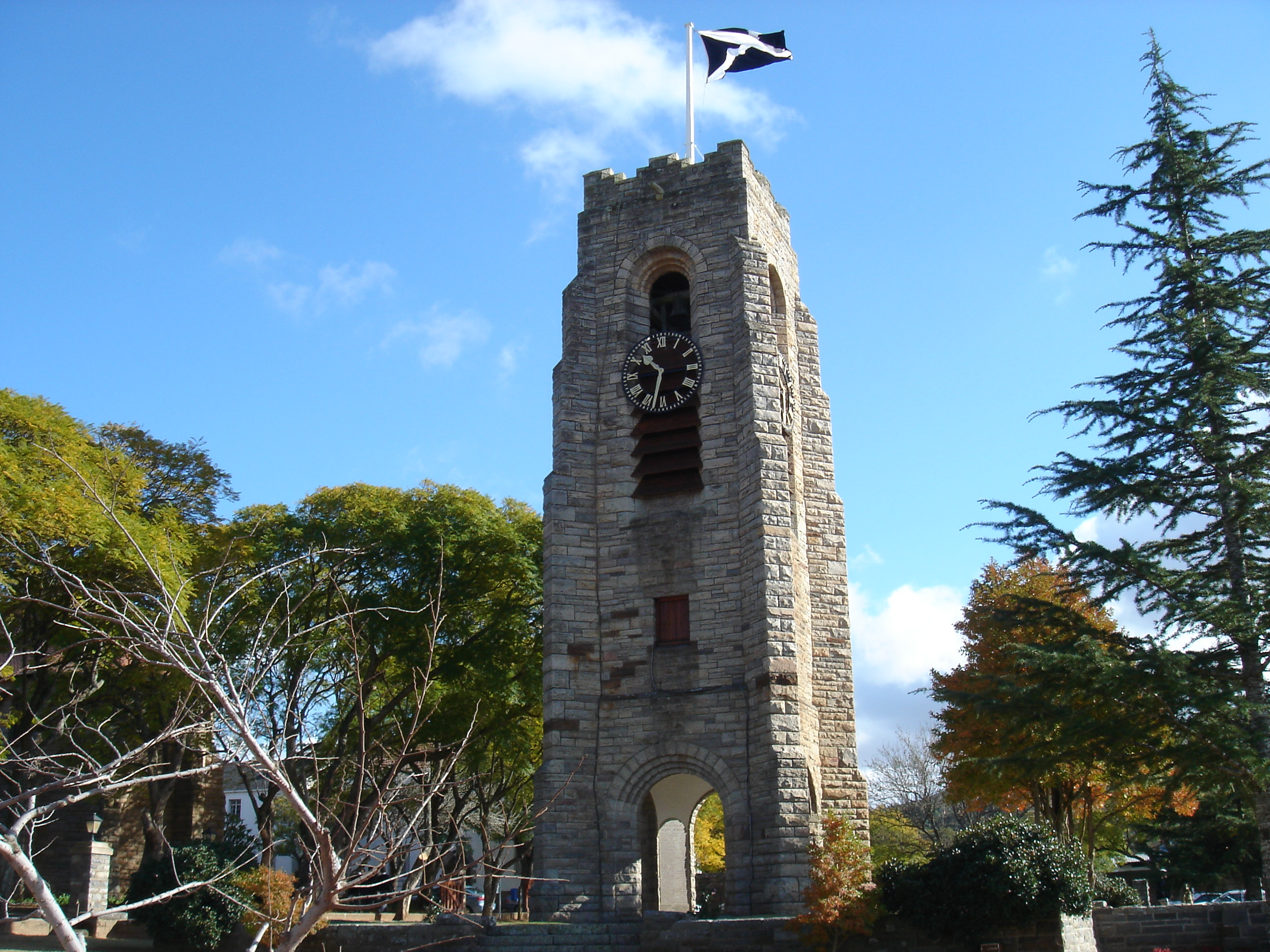
- Clockwise from top: Makhanda seen from Fort Selwyn, City Hall, St Andrews College Tower, High Street, Cathedral of St Michael and St George

- Flag

- Location within Eastern Cape Location within South Africa Location within Africa
- Coordinates: 33°18′36″S 26°31′36″E
- Country: South Africa
- Province: Eastern Cape
- District: Sarah Baartman
- Municipality: Makana
- Established: 1812

Area
  - Total: 65.1 km^{2} (25.1 sq mi)
- Elevation: 580 m (1,900 ft)

Population (2011)
  - Total: 67,264
  - Density: 1,030/km^{2} (2,680/sq mi)

Racial makeup (2011)
  - Black African: 78.9%
  - Coloured: 11.3%
  - White: 8.4%
  - Indian/Asian: 0.7%
  - Other: 0.6%

First languages (2011)
  - Xhosa: 72.2%
  - Afrikaans: 13.7%
  - English: 10.8%
  - Other: 3.4%
- Time zone: UTC+2 (SAST)
- Postal code (street): 6139
- PO box: 6140
- Area code: 046

Makhanda, also known as Grahamstown, is a town (Note: Some consider Makhanda to be a city as it has a diocesan cathedral, a high court and a university, and in years past, it was officially the City of Grahamstown) of about 75,000 people in the Eastern Cape province of South Africa. It is situated about 125 kilometres (80 mi) northeast of Gqeberha (Port Elizabeth) and 160 kilometres (100 mi) southwest of East London. It is the largest town in the Makana Local Municipality, and the seat of the municipal council. It also hosts Rhodes University, the Eastern Cape Division of the High Court, the South African Library for the Blind (SALB), a diocese of the Anglican Church of Southern Africa, and 6 South African Infantry Battalion. Furthermore, located approximately 3 km south-east of the town lies Waterloo Farm, the only estuarine fossil site in the world from 360 million years ago with exceptional soft-tissue preservation.

The town's official name-change from Grahamstown to Makhanda was officially on 29 June 2018. The new name of Makhanda was chosen in memory of Xhosa warrior and prophet Makhanda ka Nxele.

In 2025, the city was listed as the country's worst-performing municipality, with levels of infrastructural collapse, and the South African Human Rights Commission began investigating service delivery failures in the ANC-run municipality.

== History ==
=== Founding ===
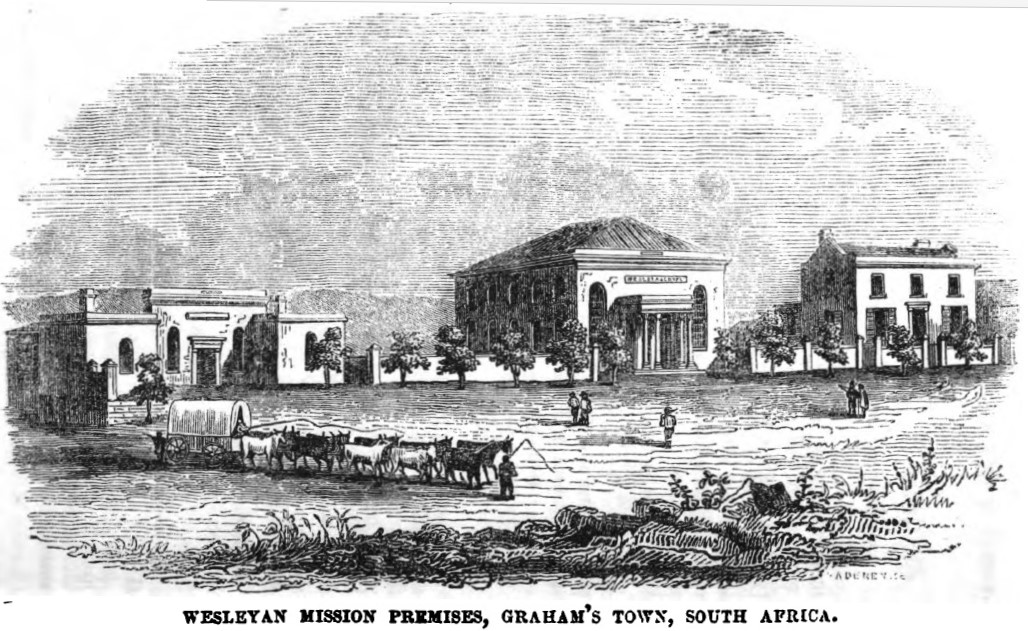
Wesleyan Mission Premises, Graham's Town, South Africa (1846)

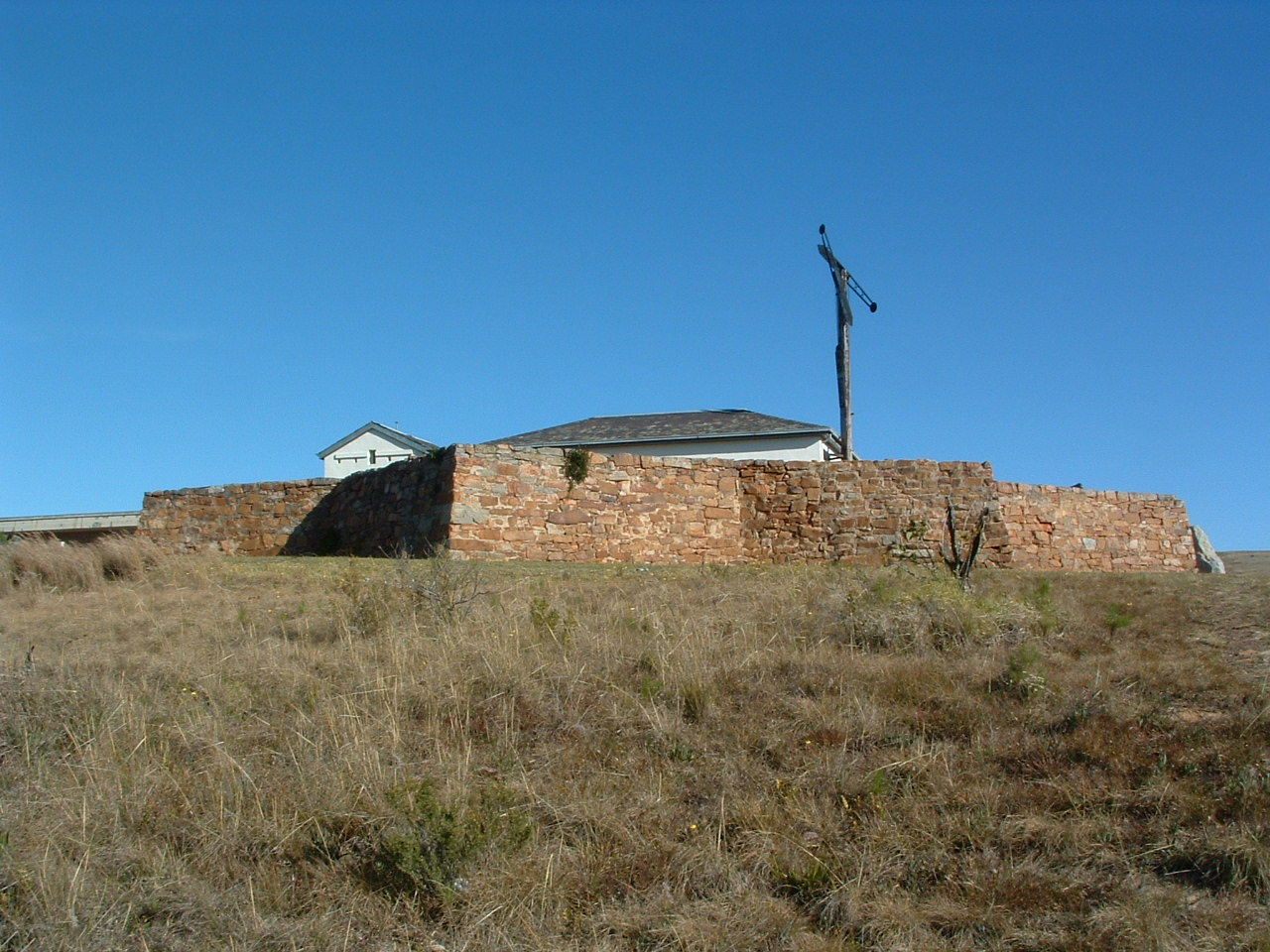
Fort Selwyn

Grahamstown was founded in 1812 after the Fourth Xhosa War as a military outpost by Lieutenant-Colonel John Graham as part of a campaign to secure the Eastern frontier of the Cape Colony. Initially Colonel Graham decided to establish his headquarters on the loan farm Noutoe, now known as Table Farm, but at the recommendation of Ensign Andries Stockenstrom it was moved to the homestead of the loan farm De Rietfontein, belonging to Lucas Meyer. Construction on the new headquarters, located on the site of the present Church Square, thus began in June 1812.

As part of the campaign, Graham was ordered to clear 20,000 Xhosa living in the region led by Ndlambe ka Rharhabe from the Zuurveld. During the campaign, which formed part of the Xhosa Wars, Graham ordered the adoption of numerous scorched earth tactics, which included the burnings of Xhosa farms. By 1812, Graham had completed his assignment, and transformed Grahamstown into the central military outpost in the region.

=== Battle of Grahamstown ===
On 22 April 1819, a large number of Xhosa warriors, under the leadership of Nxele (or the Xhosa prophet Makhanda), launched an attack against the British garrison stationed at Grahamstown. The Xhosas had warned Colonel Willshire, the commanding officer, of their planned attack on the settlement. It was one of countless attacks launched on the nascent colony by the Xhosas. During the course of the battle, the British were running low on ammunition. The Xhosas, with a force of 10,000 troops under the overall command of Ndlambe's warrior son, Mdushane, were unable to overpower the garrison of some 300 men. Nxele surrendered and was taken captive and imprisoned on Robben Island. On Christmas Day in 1819, he tried to escape but drowned in the attempt.

=== Growth ===
Grahamstown grew during the 1820s, as many 1820 Settlers and their families left farming to establish themselves in more secure trades. In 1833, Grahamstown was described as having "two or three English merchants of considerable wealth, but scarcely any society in the ordinary sense of the word. The Public Library is a wretched affair". As of 1833, it was estimated that the population of Grahamstown was approximately 6,000. In a few decades it became the Cape Colony's largest town after Cape Town. It became a bishopric in 1852. It was traditionally the capital and cultural centre of the Albany area, a district that was traditionally English-speaking and had a distinctive local culture.

In 1872, the Cape Government Railways began construction of the railway line linking Grahamstown to Port Alfred on the coast and to the developing national railway network inland. It was completed and opened on 3 September 1879.

Grahamstown grew rapidly to become the second-largest city in South Africa after Cape Town until 1930. The early 1860s saw the development of more schools, the botanical gardens, and the Eastern District Supreme Court was established. In 1864, a full parliamentary session was held in Grahamstown, instead of Cape Town. There was talk of making Grahamstown the capital of the Cape Colony because of its central position. Grahamstown was the location of the testing of the first diamond find by Henry Carter Galpin.

In 1904, Rhodes University College was established in Grahamstown through a grant from the Rhodes Trust. In 1951 it became a fully-fledged University, Rhodes University.

=== Name change ===
The name "Grahamstown" originated from the Cape Hottentot Corps in the Zuurveld's Commander of the Regiment, Colonel John Graham, who, in June 1812, oversaw the construction on the corps' new headquarters, located on the site of the present Church Square. Grahamstown went on to become a religious, military, administrative, judicial, and educational centre for the surrounding region of Albany.

Arts and Culture Minister Nathi Mthethwa announced the name change from Grahamstown in the Government Gazette No. 641 of 29 June 2018. The purpose of gazetting was to publicise the minister's decision for objections or comments by 28 July 2018.

Prompted by a Truth and Reconciliation Commission recommendation that geographic features, including geographical names, be renamed as a "symbolic reparation to address an unjust past", a proposal was for the town to be renamed after Makhanda, in recognition of his failed attack against the settlement's garrison in 1819. On 2 October 2018, Grahamstown was officially renamed Makhanda. Both names are used.

== Religion ==
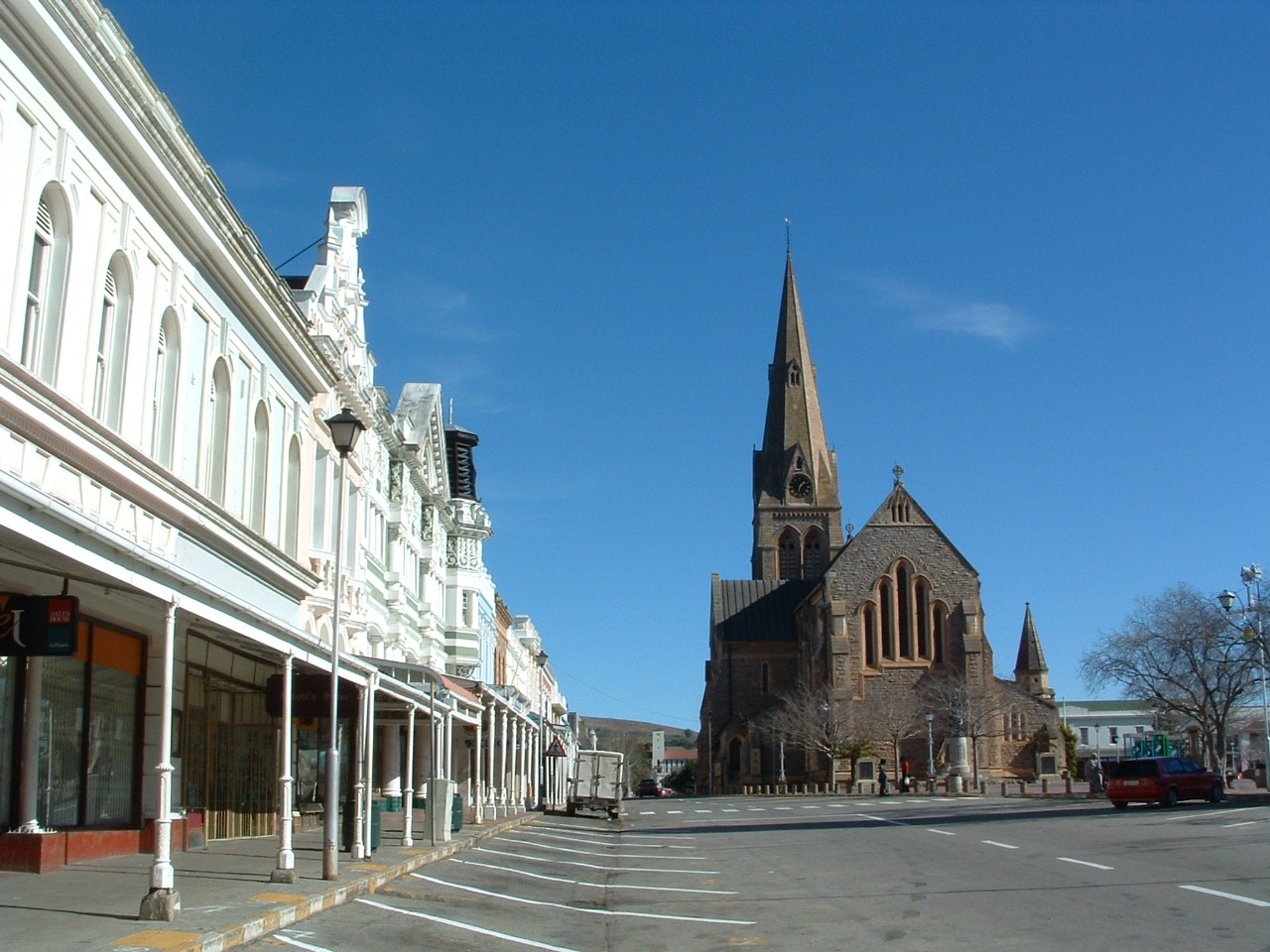
A view of St Michael and St George Cathedral in Church street

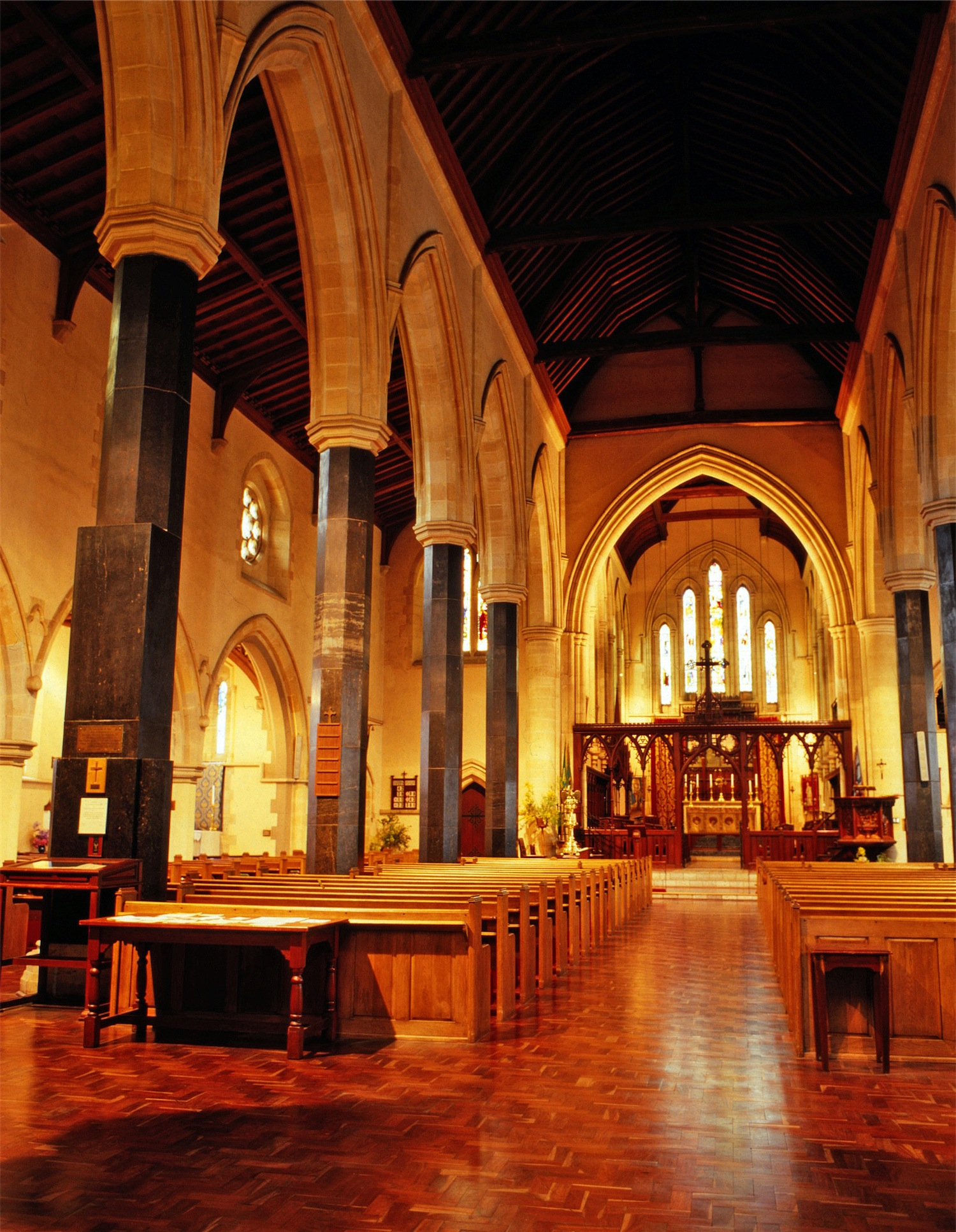
The interior of St Michael and St George Cathedral

St. Michael and St. George Cathedral is the seat of the Anglican Diocese of Grahamstown. The town also has Roman Catholic, Presbyterian, Ethiopian Episcopal, Methodist, Baptist, Pinkster Protestante, Dutch Reformed (Nederduits Gereformeerde Kerk), Charismatic, Apostolic and Pentecostal churches. There are also meeting places for Hindus, Scientologists, Quakers, The Church of Jesus Christ of Latter-day Saints and Muslims.

The city is home to more than forty religious buildings and is nicknamed the "City of Saints". According to one story recorded by H. V. Morton, the town earned its nickname from Royal Engineers stationed in Grahamstown in 1846 who were in need of building tools. They sent a message to Cape Town requesting a vice to be forwarded to them from the Ordnance Stores. A reply came back, 'Buy vice locally'. The response was, "No vice in Grahamstown".

== Demographics ==
According to the 2011 census the population of the town was 67,264, of whom 78.9% described themselves as "Black African", 11.3% as "Coloured" and 8.4% as "White". Since 1994, there has been a considerable influx of black people from the former Ciskei Xhosa homeland, which lies just to the east. The first language of 72.2% of the population is Xhosa, while 13.7% speak Afrikaans and 10.8% speak English.

== Education, arts and culture ==
The town is home to Rhodes University, the South African National Library for the Blind, the National English Literary Museum, the South African Institute for Aquatic Biodiversity (formerly the JLB Smith Institute), the International Library of African Music (ILAM), the Albany Museum, and the Institute for the Study of English in Africa. A number of palaeontological discoveries made from Waterloo Farm in the past two decades have sparked a global interest in the fossils of the Eastern Cape Province and this has resulted in numerous international collaborations. These discoveries and collaborations have been made possible by the persistent work of Robert W. Gess of the Devonian Ecosystem Laboratory, Albany Museum, who has dedicated most of his life excavating and studying blocks of black shale that he, with later support from the South African Roads Agency Limited (SANRAL) has rescued from road cuttings from back in the mid- 1980s.

Addressing the matric pass rate is one of the town's challenges.

In March 1984, the City of Grahamstown adopted a flag, one of six designs prepared by heraldic expert Prof. Hugh Smith, of Rhodes University.

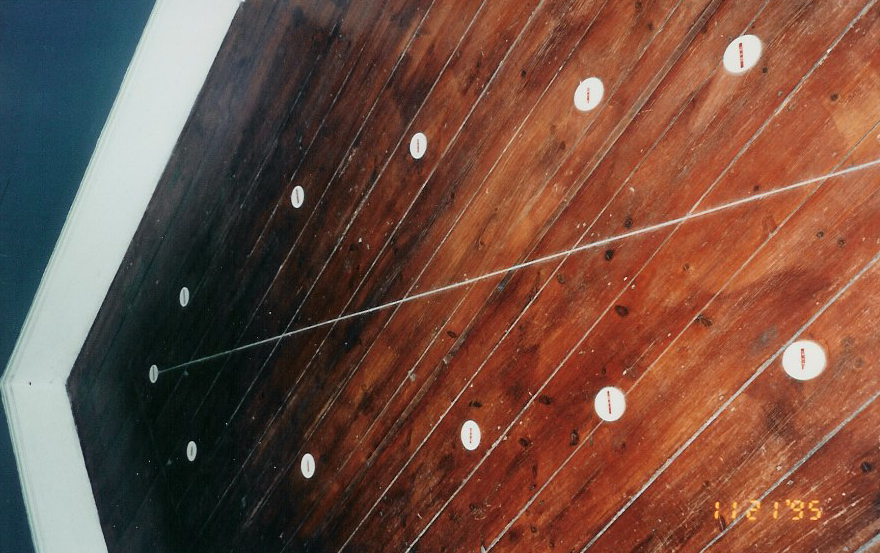
Part of the analemma that amateur astronomer Galpin inscribed on the floor of the Meridian Room

=== Clock towers in the town ===
The following is a list of tower clocks in the town, with their location and if they are in working order:

- St Michael and St George Cathedral, in working order, 33°18′37″S 26°31′36″E
- City Hall, not in working order, 33°18′34″S 26°31′39″E
- Rhodes University, in working order, 33°18′48″S 26°31′14″E
- High Court, not in working order, 33°18′41″S 26°31′30″E
- Dutch Reformed Church, in working order, 33°18′54″S 26°31′49″E
- Observatory Museum, not in working order, 33°18′36″S 26°31′45″E
- St. Andrew's College, in working order, 33°18′26″S 26°31′10″E
- Kingswood College chapel, in working order, 33°18′16″S 26°31′51″E

=== Festivals ===
Two large festivals take place annually in the town: the National Arts Festival in June/July and SciFest Africa in the first term of the year and attracts some 50,000 people. The National Arts Festival is the largest Arts festival in Africa and sees some of the leading talent on the South African and international art scene arriving in the town for a celebration of culture and artistic expression. South Africa's National Science Festival, was established in 1996 to promote the public awareness, understanding and appreciation of science, technology, engineering, mathematics and innovation. The town is also host to the Puku Story Festival since 2013 presented by the Puku Children's Literature Foundation. The festival was created in partnership with the National Arts Festival and the African Studies Department at Rhodes University with the aim to facilitate access to literature and educational/recreational materials in Xhosa.

=== Schools ===
School	Year Founded	Denomination	Language	Grades	Gender	Private/Public
St Andrew's College	1855	Anglican	English	8–12	Single sex male	Private
Graeme College (known variously before 1939 as Victoria Boys' High School and the Grahamstown Public School)	1873	Non-denominational	English	0–12	Single sex male	Public
Diocesan School for Girls (D.S.G.)	1874	Anglican	English	4–12	Single sex female	Private
St Aidan's College	1876 (closed 1973)	Jesuit	English	?–12	Single sex male	Private
St. Andrew's Preparatory School	1885	Anglican	English	0–7	Single sex male (Co-ed. until Gr.4)	Private
Good Shepherd School	1884	Anglican	English	1–7	co-educational	Private/public partnership
Kingswood College	1894	Methodist	English	0–12	Co-educational	Private
Victoria Girls' High School	1897	Non-denominational	English	8–12	Single sex female	Public
Victoria Girls' Primary	1945	Non-denominational	English	0–7	Single sex female	Public
Oatlands Preparatory	1949	Non-denominational	English	0–7	Co-educational	Public
P.J. Olivier	1956	Non-denominational	Afrikaans	0–12	Co-educational	Public
Andrew Moyake School for Excellence		Non-denominational	Xhosa/Afrikaans	8–12	Co-educational	Public

== Press ==
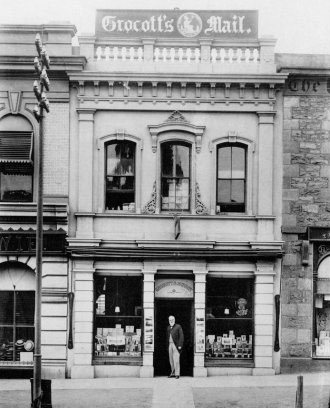
Thomas Henry Grocott 1838 to 1912 - founder and original owner Grocott's Mail standing in front of the Grocott's Mail newspaper offices

The town is home to the oldest surviving independent newspaper in South Africa. Grocott's Mail was founded in 1870 by the Grocott family, and bought out a newspaper called the Grahamstown Journal, which was founded in 1831. Robert Godlonton, a previous owner of the Journal had used it and his other papers to oppose Andries Stockenström's treaty system and advocated seizing more land from the Xhosa. It is now a local newspaper operated by the Rhodes University School of Journalism and Media Studies, and still retains its name.

As a major centre for journalism training, Rhodes University also hosts two student newspapers, Activate, established in 1947, and The Oppidan Press, a student initiative launched in 2007 that caters mainly to the student population living off-campus.

== Government ==
With the establishment of the Union of South Africa the Grahamstown High Court became a Local Division of the newly formed Supreme Court of South Africa (under Cape Town). On 28 June 1957, the Eastern Districts Court, under the name Eastern Cape Division, became a provincial division. In certain other areas of provincial government, Grahamstown similarly served as a centre for the Eastern Cape.

In 1994, Grahamstown became part of the newly established Eastern Cape Province, while Bhisho was chosen as the provincial capital.

It is the seat of the Eastern Cape Division of the High Court, as well as the Magistrate's Court for the Albany District. As a result of the presence of a High Court, several other related organs of state such as a Masters Office and a Director of Public Prosecutions are present in the town. A few other Government (mostly provincial) departments maintain branches or other offices in the town.

Grahamstown was the only settlement outside Cape Town to host a sitting of the Cape Colony legislature (a move to defuse a call for the creation of a separate colony).

=== Municipal government ===
Grahamstown had its own municipality until 2000. Since then, it has expanded into the Makana Local Municipality in the Cacadu District.

From 2012, the Makana Local Municipality was unable to reliably provide water to its citizens. The crisis continued to grow during 2013.

In 2013, South Africa's minister of water Edna Molewa was tasked with restoring the water supply of Grahamstown following protests over a nine-day water outage. Causes for the outage include financial mismanagement, with under-spending on infrastructure. The task force established by Molewa had not solved the problem by 2014. A 2021 auditor-general's report found that the municipality’s liabilities exceeded its assets by R813 million (equivalent to US$ 54.2 million) and that it has failed to keep full and proper records. By 2022 senior management was the subject of a criminal investigation and provincial government had to make quarterly reports to the Supreme Court of Appeal on the municipality's financial recovery.

=== Social issues ===
In October 2015, more than 500 people were displaced and more than 300 shops looted during a wave of xenophobic violence.

Some people use traditional African medicine because it is believed to be effective. There are some plants which are popular with the indigenous people of the area.

=== Coat of arms ===
Municipality (1) — The first arms were assumed in September 1862. They quartered an incorrect version of the arms of Graham of Fintry with those of Jan van Riebeeck (in incorrect colours), with an ostrich as a crest. The supporters were a leopard and a giraffe, and the motto was Virtute et opera.

Municipality (2) — In response to a call by the Cape Provincial Administration for municipalities to have their coats of arms checked and, if necessary, re-designed, the city council had a new coat of arms designed by Ivan Mitford-Barberton and H. Ellis Tomlinson in 1950. It was granted by the College of Arms on 20 July 1950, and registered at the Bureau of Heraldry in September 1994.

The new arms were: Or, on a pile Gules, three annulets placed 2 and 1 Or; on a chief Sable, three escallops Or (in layman's terms: a golden shield displaying, from top to bottom, three golden scallop shells on a black horizontal stripe, and three golden rings on a red triangle). The crest was changed to a plume of ostrich feathers issuing from a golden mural crown, and the supporters were differenced by placing an escallop on each shoulder.

=== Social movements ===
In 2017, Makana Revive! an independent civil society organisation was formed. During the first quarter of 2018, Makana Revive made national news when it spearheaded an initiative to repair failing infrastructure and improve the security and hygiene in the CBD. Donations were received from both local and international citizens and alumni.

The South African Unemployed Peoples' Movement has a strong presence in Makhanda.

== Notable people ==
- Robert Armitage – cricketer
- William Guybon Atherstone – medical doctor, naturalist, geologist, and member of the Cape Parliament.
- H. K. Ayliff – British theatre director
- Ignatius Ferreira, miner, soldier and farmer
- Elize du Toit – actress and director
- Andre Brink – novelist and Rhodes University professor
- Allister Coetzee – South African Rugby Head Coach
- John 'Jack' Biddulph Dold – Union rugby player and international cricketer
- Elize du Toit – British actress
- Kingsley Fairbridge – founder of Fairbridge Schools
- Ernest Edward Galpin (1858–1941) – botanist and banker
- Robert Godlonton – politician, author, owner of Grahamstown Journal
- James Henry Greathead (1844–1896) – engineer renowned for his work on the London Underground railway
- Nigel Harris – British actor
- Sir James Rose Innes – second Chief Justice of South Africa
- AJ Kerr – legal academic
- Johan Klopper – cricketer
- Harold Le Roith – architect
- Hennie le Roux – former South African (Springbok) centre (1993-1996).
- Robert Jeremy Mansfield – radio host, television presenter and comedian
- Patrick Moran – Catholic bishop
- Lex Mpati – judge, retired president of the Supreme Court of Appeal and chancellor of Rhodes University.
- Charles Mullins – Victoria Cross recipient
- Norman Ogilvie Norton – cricketer (allrounder)
- Mike Pentz (1924–1995) – physicist, born and educated in Grahamstown before moving to the United Kingdom
- Alfred Renfrew Richards – cricketer and rugby union player
- George Rowe – cricketer
- Enid Sounders – South African scientist and naturalist of Scottish descent who studied rodents (1885–1970)
- Basil Schonland (1896–1972) – physicist, was born and educated in Grahamstown
- Selmar Schonland (1860–1940) – botanist
- Ian Smith (1919–2007) – Prime Minister of Rhodesia, student at Rhodes University
- James Leonard Brierley Smith (1897–1968), ichthyologist and organic chemist
- William Smith – television science and mathematics presenter
- Josie Wood – founder, South African National Library for the Blind

== Climate ==
Climate data for Makhanda, elevation 642 m (2,106 ft), (1991–2020 normals, extremes 1998–2023)
Month	Jan	Feb	Mar	Apr	May	Jun	Jul	Aug	Sep	Oct	Nov	Dec	Year
Record high °C (°F)	40.4 (104.7)	40.3 (104.5)	40.7 (105.3)	37.3 (99.1)	31.1 (88.0)	28.5 (83.3)	28.7 (83.7)	33.5 (92.3)	36.0 (96.8)	39.9 (103.8)	37.9 (100.2)	38.3 (100.9)	40.7 (105.3)
Mean daily maximum °C (°F)	28.3 (82.9)	28.7 (83.7)	27.4 (81.3)	24.9 (76.8)	23.0 (73.4)	21.1 (70.0)	21.0 (69.8)	22.1 (71.8)	22.8 (73.0)	24.4 (75.9)	25.0 (77.0)	26.7 (80.1)	24.6 (76.3)
Daily mean °C (°F)	21.6 (70.9)	22.1 (71.8)	20.8 (69.4)	18.6 (65.5)	16.4 (61.5)	14.2 (57.6)	14.1 (57.4)	14.9 (58.8)	15.9 (60.6)	17.4 (63.3)	18.3 (64.9)	20.2 (68.4)	17.9 (64.2)
Mean daily minimum °C (°F)	14.9 (58.8)	15.6 (60.1)	14.3 (57.7)	12.2 (54.0)	9.8 (49.6)	7.4 (45.3)	7.1 (44.8)	7.7 (45.9)	8.7 (47.7)	10.5 (50.9)	11.8 (53.2)	13.7 (56.7)	11.1 (52.1)
Record low °C (°F)	6.4 (43.5)	7.7 (45.9)	5.8 (42.4)	3.1 (37.6)	3.4 (38.1)	−0.5 (31.1)	−1.7 (28.9)	−0.4 (31.3)	1.3 (34.3)	3.8 (38.8)	4.2 (39.6)	5.7 (42.3)	−1.7 (28.9)
Average precipitation mm (inches)	60.3 (2.37)	66.5 (2.62)	79.3 (3.12)	53.3 (2.10)	44.9 (1.77)	33.1 (1.30)	33.8 (1.33)	42.8 (1.69)	60.3 (2.37)	75.5 (2.97)	76.3 (3.00)	62.7 (2.47)	688.8 (27.11)
Average precipitation days (≥ 0.25 mm)	8.1	8.1	9.0	6.7	5.5	4.0	4.1	5.2	6.7	8.3	8.2	7.1	81
Source: Starlings Roost Weather (precipitation 1877–2023)

== See also ==
- Makana Local Municipality
- Albany, South Africa
- 1820 Settlers

=== Major organisations ===
- Diocese of Grahamstown
- Grocott's Mail
- International Library of African Music
- National Arts Festival
- National English Literary Museum
- Rhodes University
- South African Institute for Aquatic Biodiversity
- South African Library for the Blind
