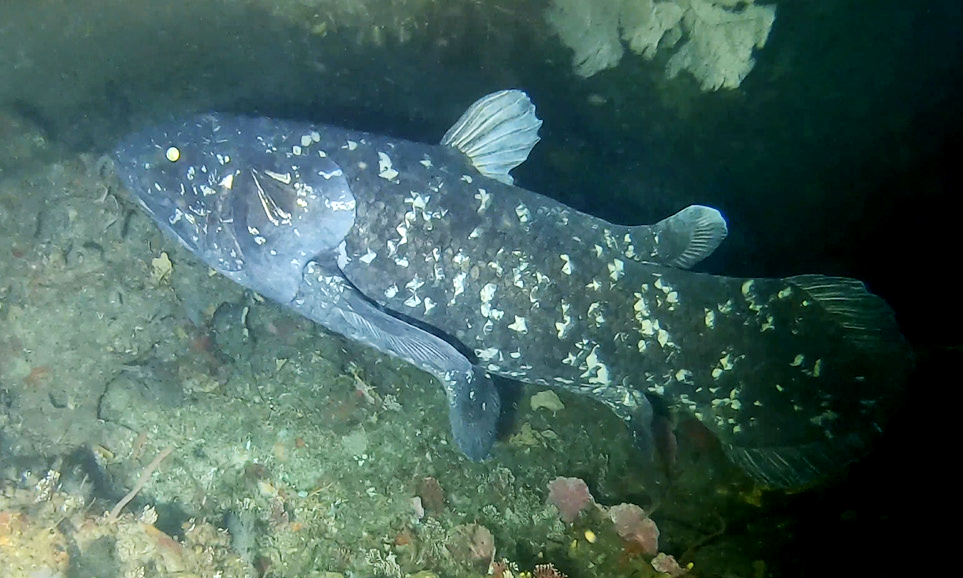
- West Indian Ocean coelacanth (L. chalumnae)
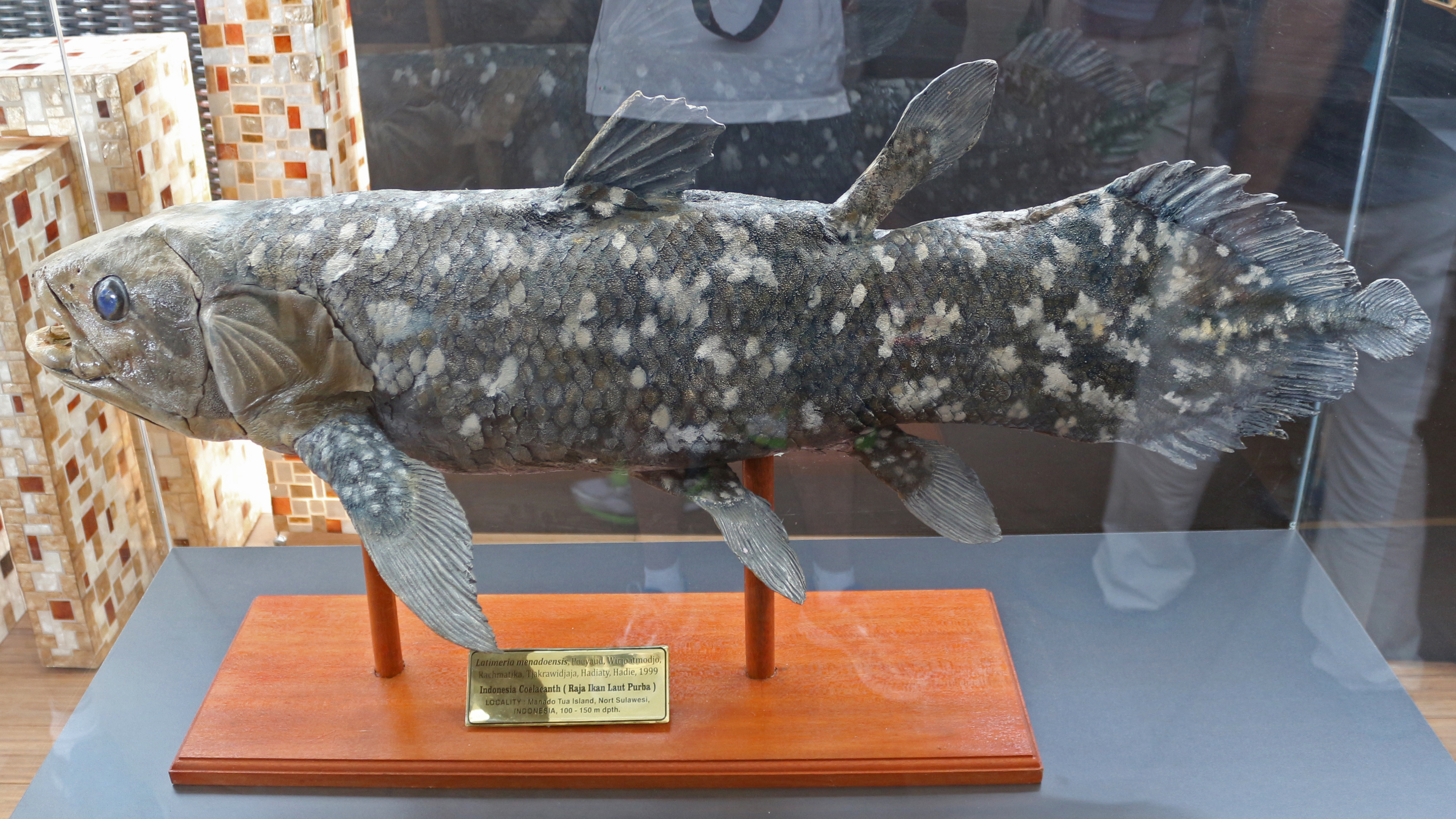
- Indonesian coelacanth (L. menadoensis)

Scientific classification
- Kingdom: Animalia
- Phylum: Chordata
- Class: Actinistia
- Order: Coelacanthiformes
- Suborder: Latimerioidei
- Family: Latimeriidae
- Genus: Latimeria; Smith, 1939

Type species
- Latimeria chalumnae

Species
- L. chalumnae Smith, 1939; L. menadoensis Pouyaud et al., 1999
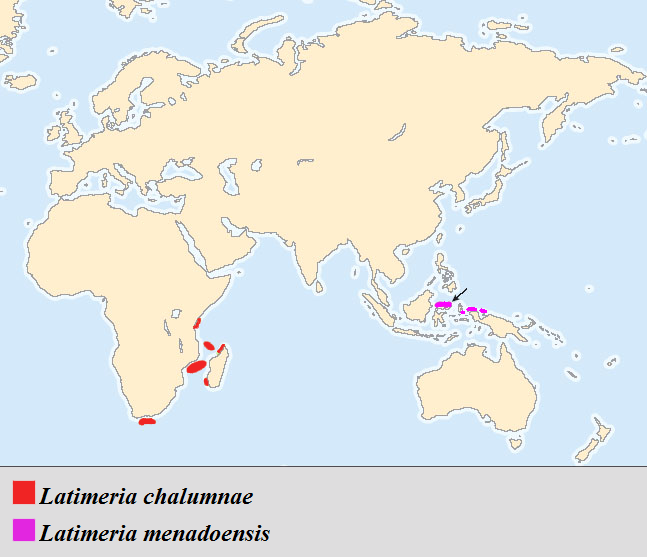
- Range in red and violet

Synonyms
- Malania Smith, 1953 non Chun & Lee, 1980

= Latimeria =

Genus of lobe-finned fishes from the Indian Ocean

Latimeria is a rare genus of fish which contains the only two extant species of coelacanth: the West Indian Ocean coelacanth (Latimeria chalumnae) and the Indonesian coelacanth (Latimeria menadoensis). They follow the oldest known living lineage of Sarcopterygii (lobe-finned fish and tetrapods), which means they are more closely related to lungfish and tetrapods (amphibians, reptiles and mammals) than to the common ray-finned fishes and cartilaginous fishes.

They are found along the coastlines of the Indian Ocean and Indonesia. Since there are only two known species of coelacanth and both are threatened, it is one of the most endangered genera of animals in the world. The West Indian Ocean coelacanth is a critically endangered species.

== Description ==
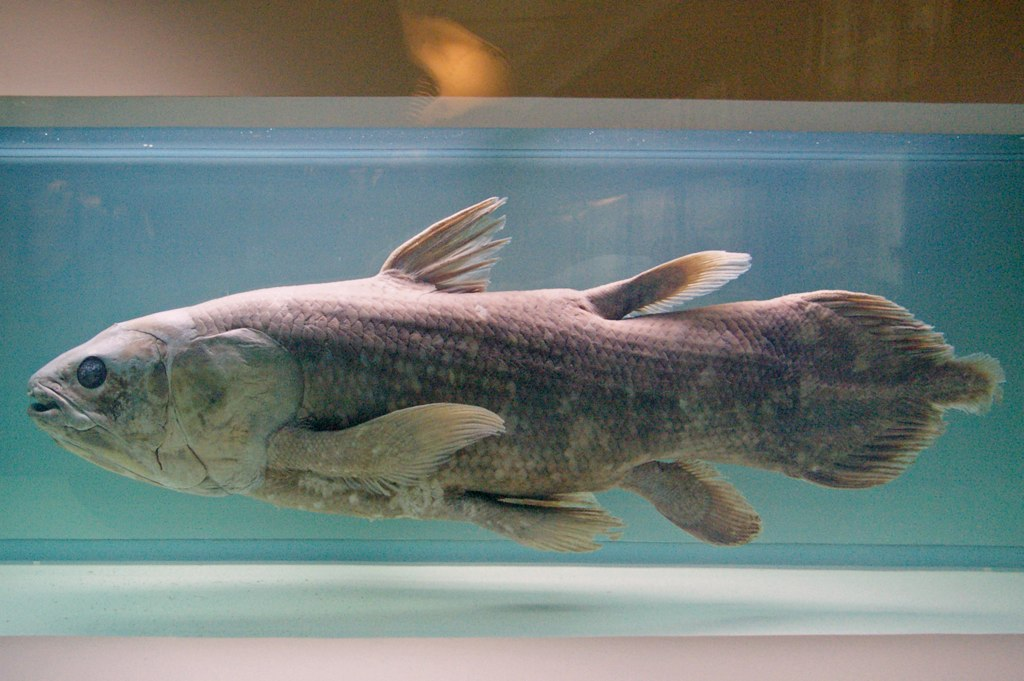
Latimeria chalumnae specimen, Natural History Museum of Nantes

Coelacanths of genus Latimeria are large, plump, lobe-finned fish that can grow to more than 2 m (6.6 ft) and weigh around 90 kg (200 lb). They are estimated to live up to 100 years, based on analysis of annual growth marks on scales, and reach maturity around the age of 55; the oldest known specimen was 84 years old at the time of its capture in 1960.

Based on growth rings in the creatures' ear bones (otoliths), scientists infer that individual coelacanths may live as long as 80 to 100 years. Coelacanths live as deep as 700 m (2300 ft) below sea level, but are more commonly found at depths of 90 to 200 m (300 to 660 ft).

Living examples of Latimeria chalumnae have a deep blue color which probably camouflages them from prey species; meanwhile, the Indonesian species (L. menadoensis) is brown.

=== Anatomy and physiology ===
Coelacanth eyes are very sensitive, and have a tapetum lucidum. Coelacanths are almost never caught in the daytime, but have been caught at all phases of the moon. Coelacanth eyes have many rods, receptors in the retina that help animals see in dim light. Together, the rods and tapetum help the fish see better in dark water. The eye is acclimatized to seeing in poor light by rods that absorb mostly short wavelengths. Coelacanth vision has evolved to a mainly blue-shifted color capacity. Pseudomaxillary folds surround the mouth and replace the maxilla, a structure absent in coelacanths. Two nostrils, along with four other external openings, appear between the premaxilla and lateral rostral bones. The nasal sacs resemble those of many other fish and do not contain an internal nostril. The coelacanth's rostral organ, contained within the ethmoid region of the braincase, has three unguarded openings into the environment and is used as a part of the coelacanth's laterosensory system. The coelacanth's auditory reception is mediated by its inner ear, which is very similar to that of tetrapods and is classified as being a basilar papilla.

The coelacanth's heart is shaped differently from that of most modern fish, with its chambers arranged in a straight tube. The coelacanth's braincase is 98.5% filled with fat; only 1.5% of the braincase contains brain tissue. The cheeks of the coelacanth are unique because the opercular bone is very small and holds a large soft-tissue opercular flap. A spiracular chamber is present, but the spiracle is closed and never opens during development. Also unique to extant coelacanths is the presence of a "fatty lung" or a fat-filled single-lobed vestigial lung, homologous to other fishes' swim bladders. The parallel development of a fatty organ for buoyancy control suggests a unique specialization for deep-water habitats. There are small and hard but flexible plates around the vestigial lung in adult specimens, though not around the fatty organ. The plates most likely had a regulation function for the volume of the lung. Due to the size of the fatty organ, researchers assume that it is responsible for the kidney's unusual relocation. The two kidneys, which are fused into one, are located ventrally within the abdominal cavity, posterior to the cloaca.

Scientific research suggests the coelacanth must stay in cold, well-oxygenated water or else its blood cannot absorb enough oxygen. The fish seems to be very well adapted to its environment, which is seen as one of the reasons why it has the slowest evolving genome of all known vertebrates.

== Biology ==
Coelacanths are nocturnal piscivorous drift-hunters. Coelacanths are opportunistic feeders, hunting cuttlefish, squid, snipe eels, small sharks, and other fish found in their deep reef and volcanic slope habitats. Coelacanths are also known to swim head down, backwards or belly up to locate their prey, presumably using their rostral glands. To move around, they most commonly take advantage of up- or down-wellings of current and drift. Their paired fins stabilize movement through the water. While on the ocean floor, they do not use the paired fins for any kind of movement. Coelacanths generate thrust with their caudal fins for quick starts. Due to the abundance of its fins, the coelacanth has high maneuverability and can orient its body in almost any direction in the water. They have been seen doing headstands as well as swimming belly up. It is thought that the rostral organ helps give the coelacanth electroreception, which aids in movement around obstacles.

They are "passive drift feeders", slowly drifting along currents with only minimal self-propulsion, eating whatever prey they encounter. Coelacanths also use their rostral organ for its electroreception to be able to detect nearby prey in low light settings.

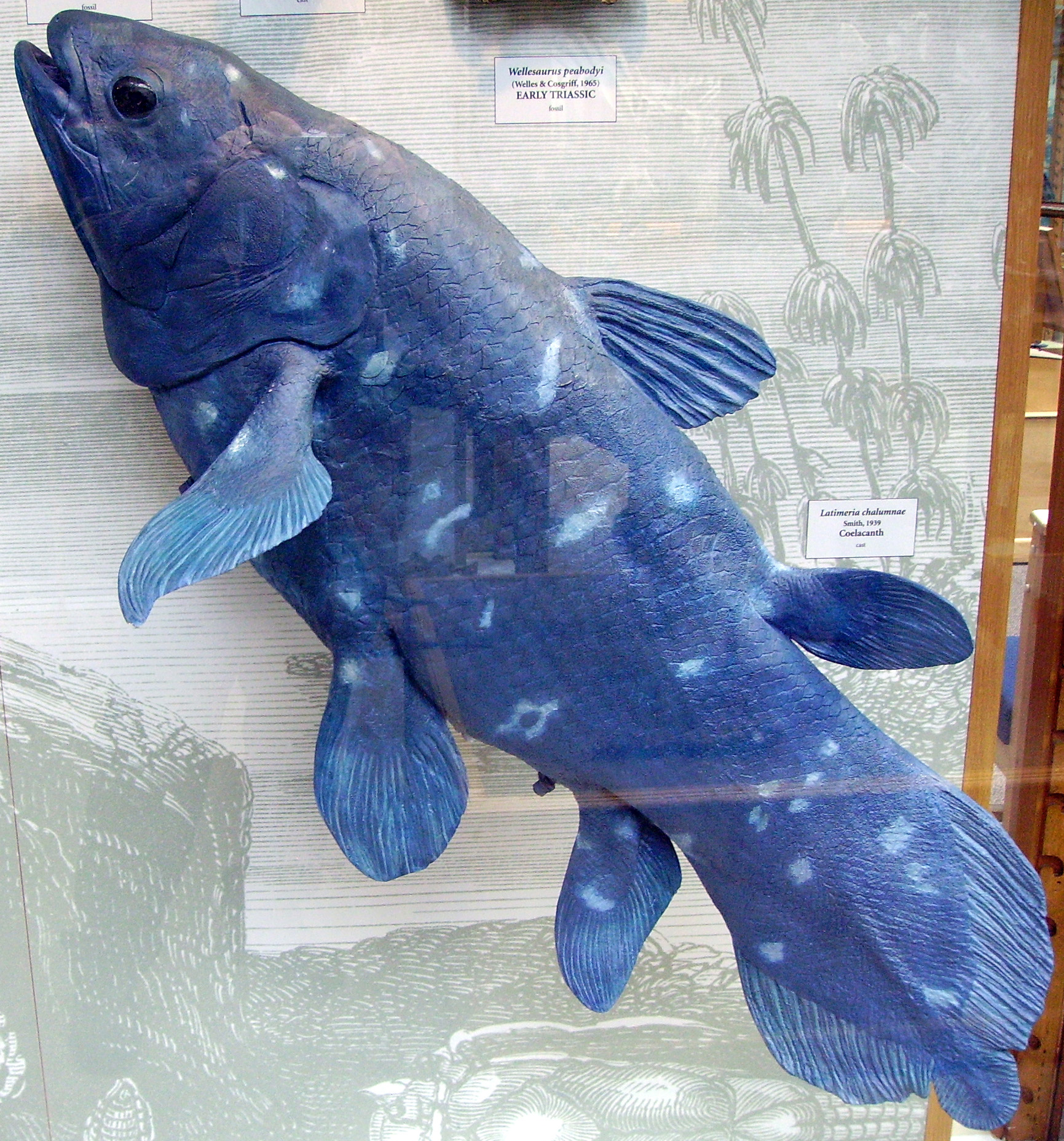
Latimeria chalumnae model in the Oxford University Museum of Natural History, showing the coloration in life

Coelacanths are fairly peaceful when encountering others of their kind. They do avoid body contact, however, withdrawing immediately if contact occurs. When approached by foreign potential predators (e.g. a submersible), they show panic flight reactions, suggesting that coelacanths are most likely prey to large deepwater predators. Shark bite marks have been seen on coelacanths; sharks are common in areas inhabited by coelacanths. Electrophoresis testing of 14 coelacanth enzymes shows little genetic diversity between coelacanth populations. Among the fish that have been caught were about equal numbers of males and females. Population estimates range from 210 individuals per population to 500 per population. Because coelacanths have individual color markings, scientists think that they recognize each other via the pattern of their light-colored spots.

The coelacanths which live near Sodwana Bay, South Africa, rest in caves at depths of 90 to 150 m (300 to 490 ft) during daylight hours, but disperse and swim to depths as shallow as 55 m (180 ft) when hunting at night. The depth is not as important as their need for very dim light and, more importantly, for water which has a temperature of 14–22 °C (57–72 °F). They will rise or sink to find these conditions. The amount of oxygen their blood can absorb from the water through the gills is dependent on water temperature.

Scientists suspect that one reason this fish has been so successful is that specimens are able to slow down their metabolisms at will, sinking into the less-inhabited depths and minimizing their nutritional requirements in a sort of hibernation mode.

=== Reproduction ===
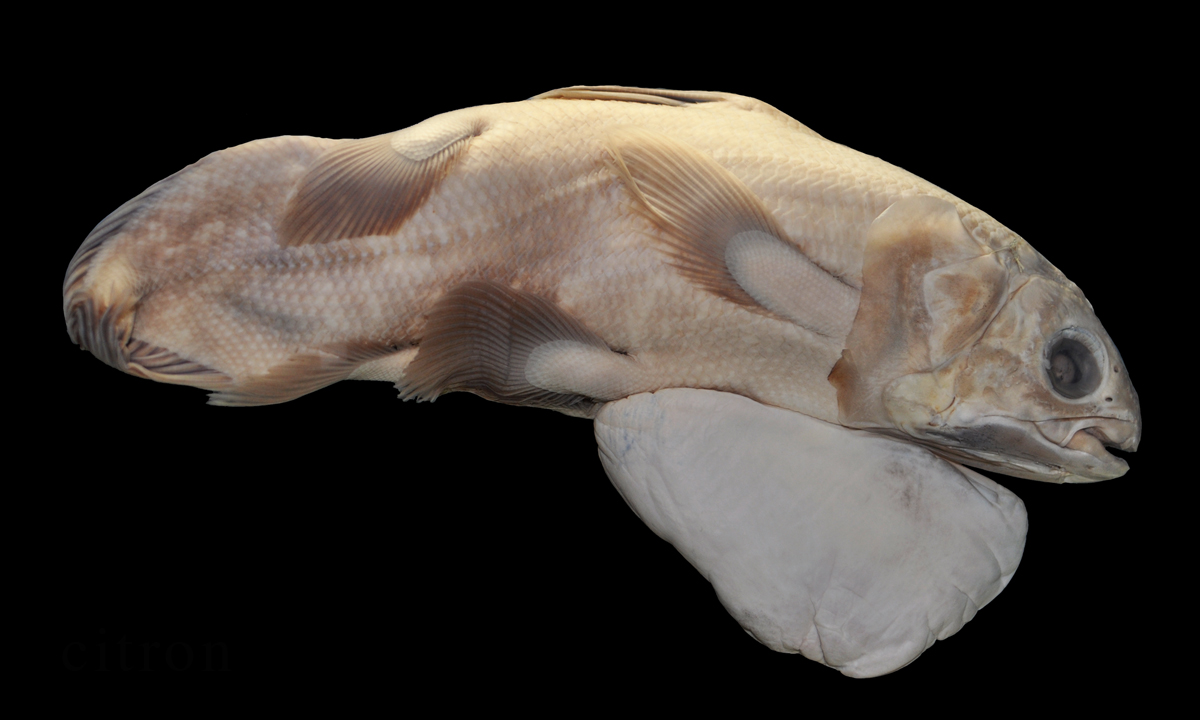
Latimeria chalumnae embryo with its yolk sac from the Muséum national d'histoire naturelle

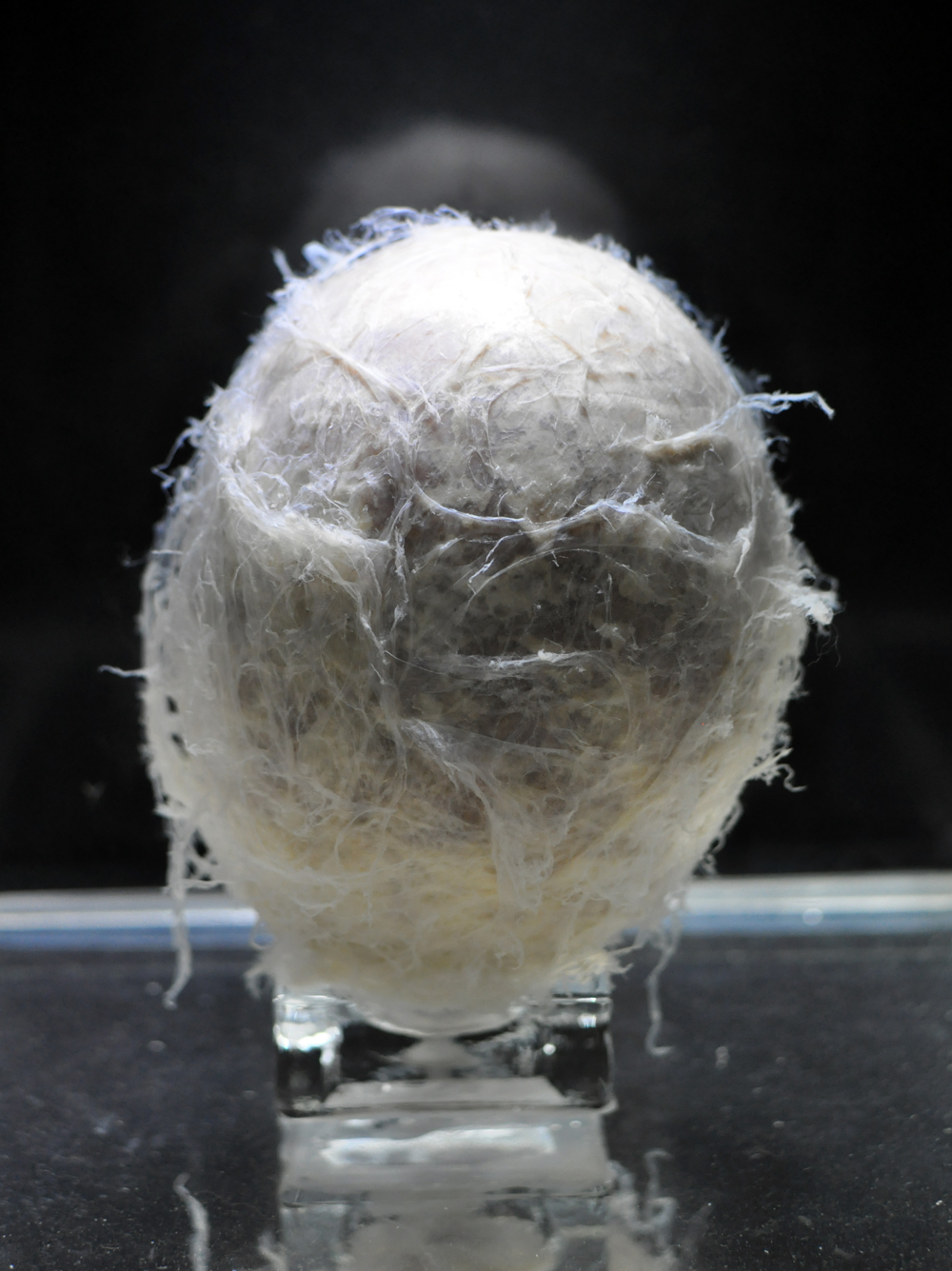
Latimeria chalumnae egg

Coelacanths are ovoviviparous, meaning that the female retains the fertilized eggs within her body while the embryos develop during a gestation period of five years. Typically, females are larger than the males; their scales and the skin folds around the cloaca differ. The male coelacanth has no distinct copulatory organs, just a cloaca, which has a urogenital papilla surrounded by erectile caruncles. It is hypothesized that the cloaca everts to serve as a copulatory organ. Coelacanth eggs are large, with only a thin layer of membrane to protect them. Embryos hatch within the female and eventually are born alive, which is a rarity in fish. This was only discovered when the American Museum of Natural History dissected its first coelacanth specimen in 1975 and found it pregnant with five embryos. Young coelacanths resemble the adult, the main differences being an external yolk sac, larger eyes relative to body size and a more pronounced downward slope of the body. The juvenile coelacanth's broad yolk sac hangs below the pelvic fins. The scales and fins of the juvenile are completely matured; however, it does lack odontodes, which it gains during maturation.

Female coelacanths give birth to live young, called "pups", in groups of between five and 25 fry at a time; the pups are capable of surviving on their own immediately after birth. Their reproductive behaviors are not well known, but it is believed that they are not sexually mature until after 20 years of age. It was thought that gestation time was 13 to 15 months, though research carried out in 2021 now suggests a gestation period of up to five years, which is 1.5 years longer than the deep-sea frilled shark, the previous record holder.

A study that assessed the paternity of the embryos inside two coelacanth females indicated that each clutch was sired by a single male. This could mean that females mate monandrously, i.e. with one male only. Polyandry, female mating with multiple males, is common in both plants and animals and can be advantageous (e.g. insurance against mating with an infertile or incompatible mate), but also confers costs (increased risk of infection, danger of falling prey to predators, increased energy input when searching for new males).

== Evolutionary relationships ==
In the Late Devonian vertebrate speciation, descendants of pelagic lobe-finned fish—like Eusthenopteron—exhibited a sequence of adaptations: Panderichthys, suited to muddy shallows; Tiktaalik with limb-like fins that could take it up onto land; and Early tetrapods in weed-filled swamps, such as Acanthostega which had feet with eight digits and Ichthyostega with limbs. Descendants also included pelagic lobe-finned fish such as the coelacanth species.

Latimeria is the type genus of Latimeriidae, a group of coelacanths that first appeared in the Early Triassic. Within Latimeriidae, it has been found by cladistic analysis to be most closely related to the genus Swenzia, known from the Late Jurassic of Europe, leaving a long ghost lineage of over 150 million years from its closest relative.

An analysis of an Indonesian coelacanth specimen recovered from Waigeo, West Papua in eastern Indonesia indicates that there may be another lineage of the Indonesian coelacanth, and the two lineages may have diverged 13 million years ago. Whether this new lineage represents a subspecies or a new species has yet to be determined.

=== Genetics ===
In 2013, a research group published the genome sequence of the coelacanth in the scientific journal Nature.

Due to their lobed fins and other features, it was once hypothesized that the coelacanth might be the youngest diverging non-tetrapod sarcopterygian. But after sequencing the full genome of the coelacanth, it was discovered that the lungfish instead is more closely related to tetrapods. Coelacanths and rhipidistians (the concestor of lungfish and tetrapods) had already diverged from each other before the lungfish made the transition to land.

Another important discovery made from the genome sequencing is that the coelacanths are still evolving today. While phenotypic similarity between extant and extinct coelacanths suggests there is limited evolutionary pressure on these organisms to undergo morphological divergence, they are undergoing measurable genetic divergence. Despite prior studies showing that protein coding regions are undergoing evolution at a substitution rate much lower than other sarcopterygians (consistent with phenotypic stasis observed between extant and fossil members of the taxa), the non-coding regions subject to higher transposable element activity show marked divergence even between the two extant coelacanth species. This has been facilitated in part by a coelacanth-specific endogenous retrovirus of the Epsilon retrovirus family.

== Distribution ==
The current coelacanth range is primarily along the eastern African coast, although Latimeria menadoensis was discovered off Indonesia. Coelacanths have been found in the waters of Kenya, Tanzania, Mozambique, South Africa, Madagascar, Comoros and Indonesia. Most Latimeria chalumnae specimens that have been caught have been captured around the islands of Grande Comore and Anjouan in the Comoros Archipelago (Indian Ocean). Though there are cases of L. chalumnae caught elsewhere, amino acid sequencing has shown no big difference between these exceptions and those found around Comore and Anjouan. Even though these few may be considered strays, there are several reports of coelacanths being caught off the coast of Madagascar. This leads scientists to believe that the endemic range of Latimeria chalumnae coelacanths stretches along the eastern coast of Africa from the Comoros Islands, past the western coast of Madagascar to the South African coastline. Mitochondrial DNA sequencing of coelacanths caught off the coast of southern Tanzania suggests a divergence of the two populations some 200,000 years ago. This could refute the theory that the Comoros population is the main population while others represent recent offshoots. A live specimen was seen and recorded on video in November 2019 at 69 m (226 ft) off the village of Umzumbe on the South Coast of KwaZulu-Natal, 325 km (202 mi) south of the iSimangaliso Wetland Park. This is the farthest south since the original discovery, and the second shallowest record after 54 m (177 ft) in the Diepgat Canyon. These sightings suggest that they may live shallower than previously thought, at least at the southern end of their range, where colder, better-oxygenated water is available at shallower depths.

The geographical range of the Indonesia coelacanth, Latimeria menadoensis, is believed to be off the coast of Manado Tua Island, Sulawesi, Indonesia, in the Celebes Sea. Key components confining coelacanths to these areas are food and temperature restrictions, as well as ecological requirements such as caves and crevices that are well-suited for drift feeding. Teams of researchers using submersibles have recorded live sightings of the fish in the Sulawesi Sea as well as in the waters of Biak in Papua.

Anjouan Island and the Grande Comore provide ideal underwater cave habitats for coelacanths. The islands' underwater volcanic slopes, steeply eroded and covered in sand, house a system of caves and crevices which allow coelacanths resting places during the daylight hours. These islands support a large benthic fish population that helps to sustain coelacanth populations.

During the daytime, coelacanths rest in caves anywhere from 100 to 500 meters (330 to 1,640 ft) deep. Others migrate to deeper waters. The cooler waters (below 120 meters or 390 feet) reduce the coelacanths' metabolic costs. Drifting toward reefs and night feeding saves vital energy. Resting in caves during the day also saves energy that otherwise would be expended to fight currents.

== Discoveries ==
Timeline of discoveries
Date	Description
pre 1938	Though unknown to the West, the South African natives knew about the fish and called it "gombessa" or "mame."
1938	(December 23) First discovery of a modern coelacanth 30 kilometers SW of East London, South Africa.
1952	(December 21) Second specimen known to science identified in the Comoros. Since then more than 200 have been caught off the islands of Grand Comore and Anjouan.
1988	First photographs of coelacanths in their natural habitat, by Hans Fricke off Grand Comore.
1991	First coelacanth identified near Mozambique, 24 kilometers offshore NE of Quelimane.
1995	First recorded coelacanth on Madagascar, 30 kilometers S of Toliara.
1997	(September 18) New species of coelacanth found in Indonesia.
2000	A group found by divers off Sodwana Bay, iSimangaliso Wetland Park, South Africa.
2001	A group found off the coast of Kenya.
2003	First coelacanth caught by fishermen in Tanzania. Within the year, 22 were caught in total.
2004	Canadian researcher William Sommers captured the largest recorded specimen of coelacanth off the coast of Madagascar.
2007	(May 19) Indonesian fisherman Justinus Lahama caught a 1.31 meter (4.30 ft) long, 51 kilogram (112 lb) coelacanth off Sulawesi Island, near Bunaken National Marine Park, that survived for 17 hours in a quarantined pool.
2007	(July 15) Two fishermen from Zanzibar caught a coelacanth measuring 1.34 meters (4.40 ft), and weighing 27 kilograms (60 lb). The fish was caught off the north tip of the island, off the coast of Tanzania.
2019	(November 22) Kwa-zulu-Natal south coast. Technical divers video recorded a coelacanth estimated at 1.8 m, 100 kg at a depth of 69n m.

=== First find in South Africa ===
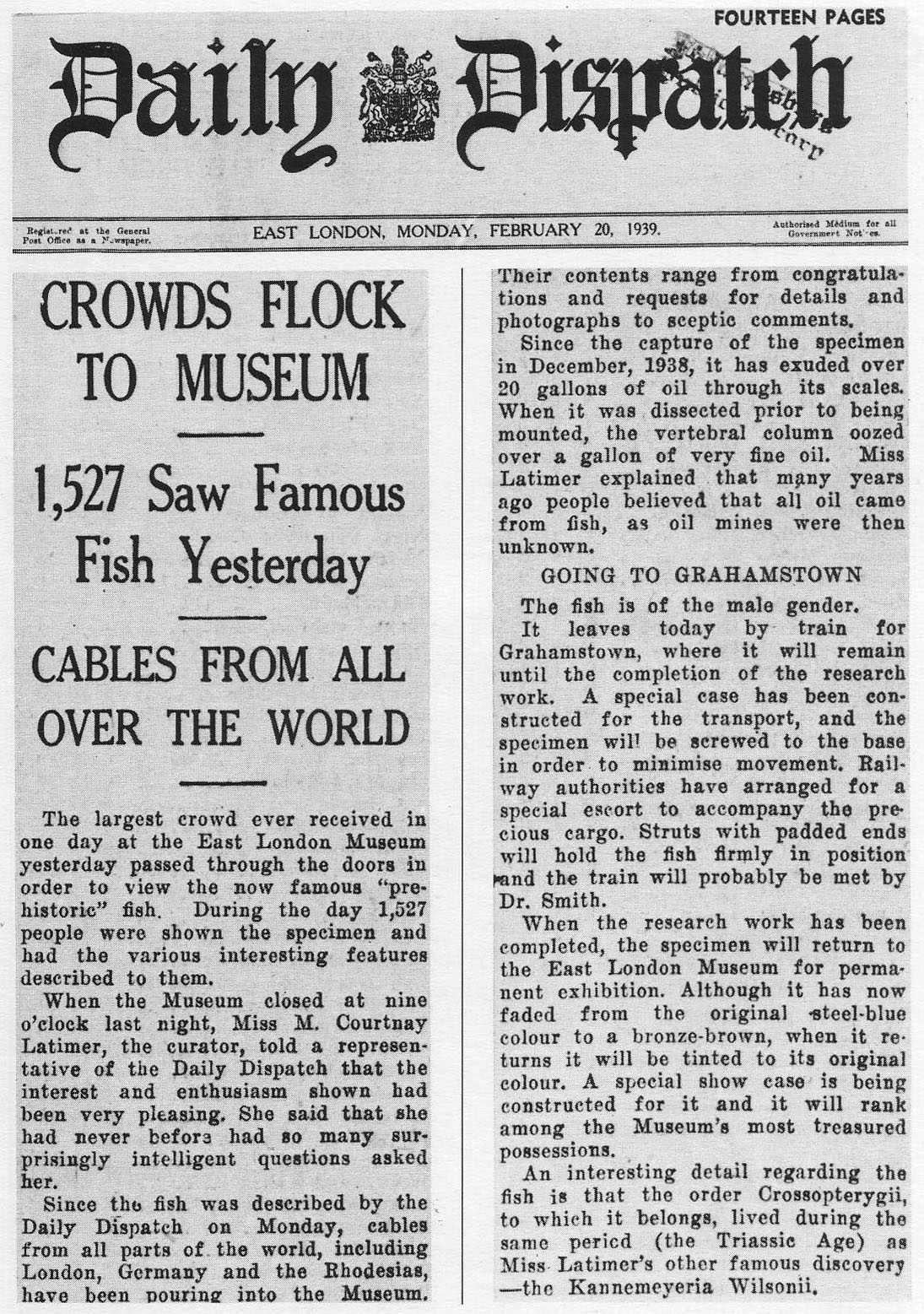
The discovery was covered in a 1939 Daily Dispatch article

On December 23, 1938, Hendrik Goosen, the captain of the trawler Nerine, returned to the harbour at East London, South Africa, after a trawl between the Chalumna and Ncera Rivers. As he frequently did, he telephoned his friend, Marjorie Courtenay-Latimer, curator at East London's small museum, to see if she wanted to look over the contents of the catch for anything interesting, and told her of the strange fish he has set aside for her.

Correspondence in the archives of the South African Institute for Aquatic Biodiversity (SAIAB, formerly the JLB Smith Institute of Ichthyology) shows that Goosen went to great lengths to avoid any damage to this fish and ordered his crew to set it aside for the East London Museum. Goosen later told how the fish was steely blue when first seen, but by the time the 'Nerine' entered East London harbour many hours later, the fish had become dark grey.

Failing to find a description of the creature in any of her books, she attempted to contact her friend, Professor James Leonard Brierley Smith, but he was away for Christmas. Unable to preserve the fish, she reluctantly sent it to a taxidermist. When Smith returned, he immediately recognized it as a type of coelacanth, a group of fish previously known only from fossils. Smith named the new coelacanth Latimeria chalumnae in honor of Marjorie Courtenay-Latimer and the waters in which it was found. The two discoverers received immediate recognition, and the fish became known as a "living fossil". The 1938 coelacanth is still on display in the East London, South Africa, museum.

However, as the specimen had been stuffed, the gills and skeleton were not available for examination, and some doubt therefore remained as to whether it was truly the same species. Smith began a hunt for a second specimen that would take more than a decade.

=== Comoros ===
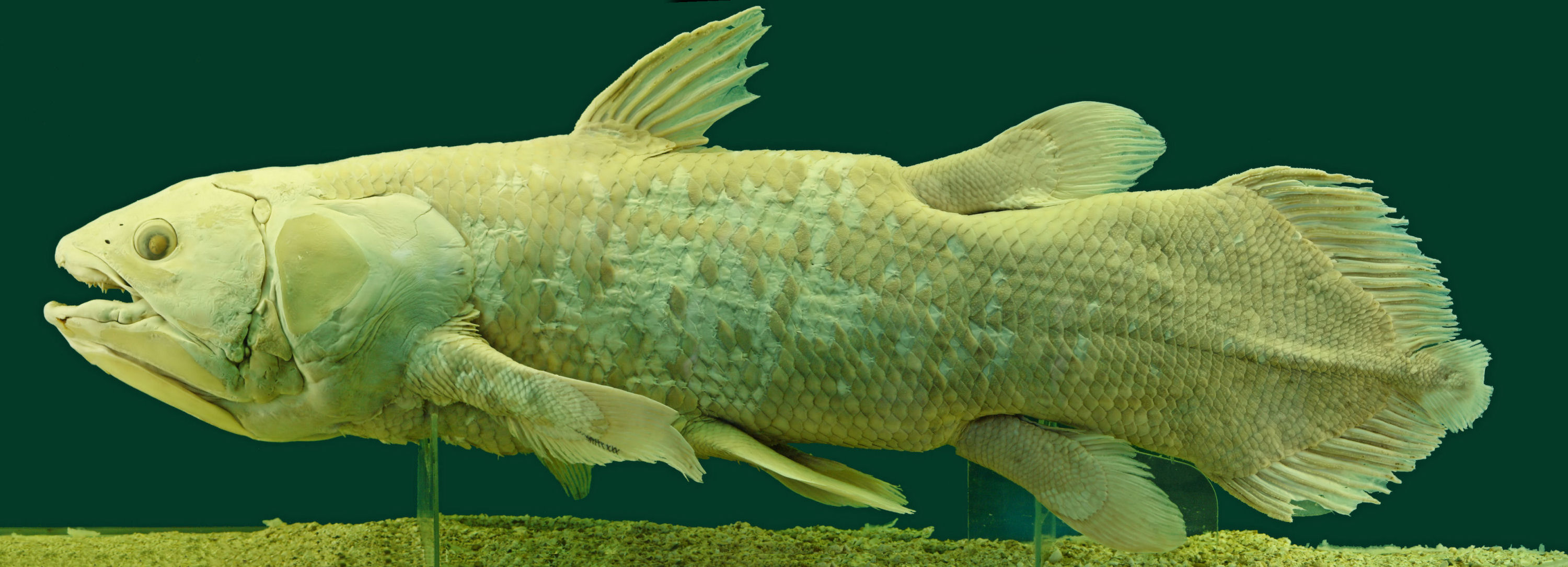
Preserved specimen of Latimeria chalumnae in the Natural History Museum, Vienna, Austria (length: 170 cm - weight: 60 kg). This specimen was caught on 18 October 1974, next to Salimani/Selimani (Grand Comore, Comoro Islands) 11°48′40.7″S 43°16′3.3″E.

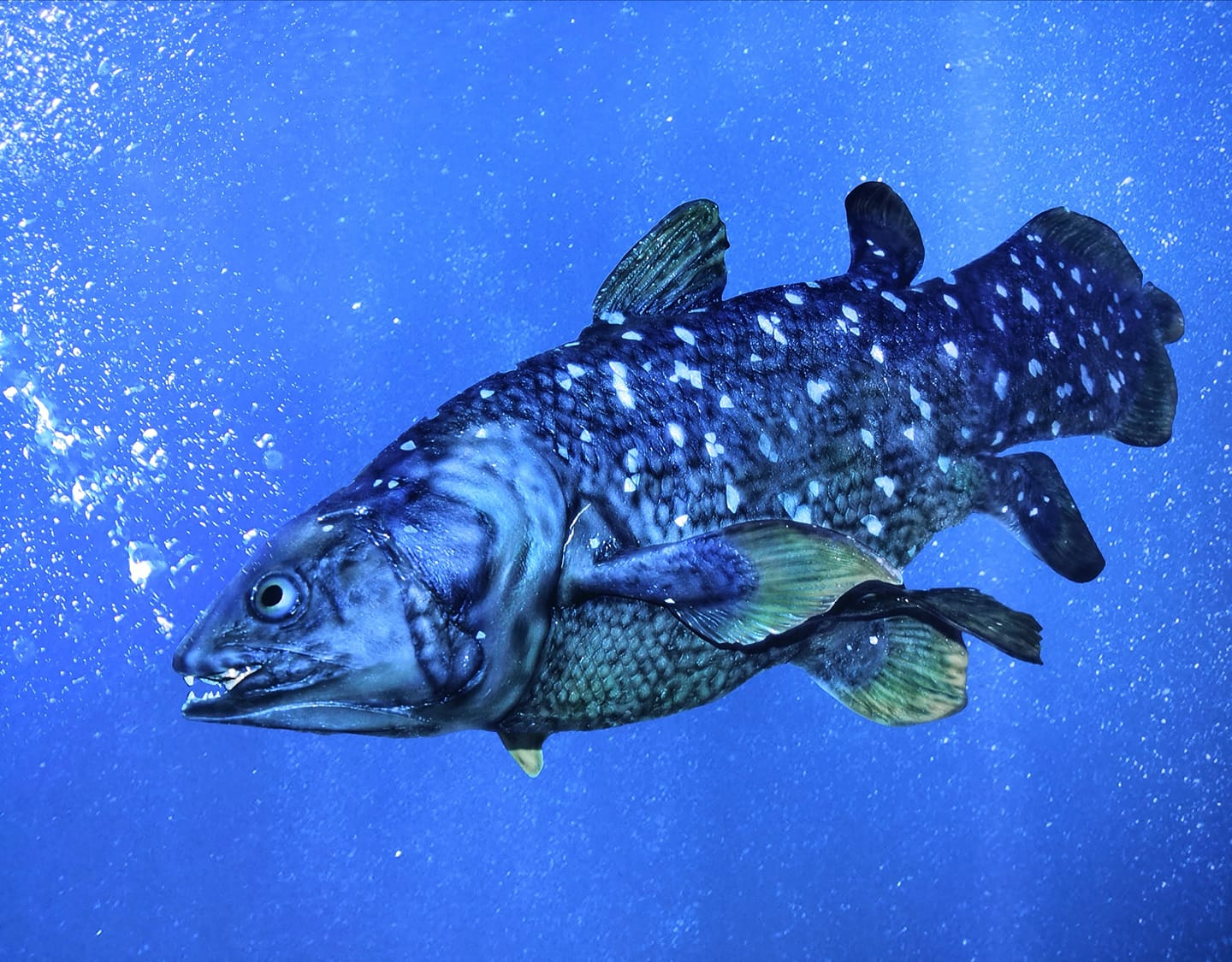
Comoran Coelacanth at the Comoros Pavilion at Expo 2020 Dubai

Smith distributed thousands of flyers with a photograph of the fish, description, and reward, but World War II interrupted the search. He also did not know that the 1938 specimen near South Africa was about 1,800 miles (2,900 km) south of its normal habitat. The 100 pound sterling reward was a very substantial sum to the average subsistence fisherman of the time. Fourteen years later, one specimen was found in the Comoros, but the fish was no stranger to the locals; in the port of Domoni on the Comoran island of Anjouan, the Comorians were puzzled to be so rewarded for a "gombessa" or "mame", their names for the nearly inedible fish that their fishermen occasionally caught by mistake.

The second specimen, found just before Christmas 1952 by Comoran fisherman Ahamadi Abdallah, was described as a different species, first as Malania hunti and later as Malania anjounae, after Daniel François Malan, the South African Prime Minister who had dispatched an SAAF Dakota at the behest of Professor Smith to fetch the specimen. It was later discovered that the lack of a first dorsal fin, at first thought to be significant, was caused by an injury early in the specimen's life. Malan was a staunch creationist; when he was first shown the primitive creature, he exclaimed, with a twinkle, "My, it is ugly. Do you mean to say we once looked like that?" The specimen retrieved by Smith is on display at the SAIAB in Grahamstown, South Africa where he worked.

A third specimen was caught in September 1953 and a fourth in January 1954. The Comorans are now aware of the significance of the endangered species, and have established a program to return accidentally-caught coelacanth to deep water.

As for Smith, who died in 1968, his account of the coelacanth story appeared in the book Old Fourlegs, first published in 1956. His book Sea Fishes of the Indian Ocean, illustrated and co-authored by his wife Margaret, remains the standard ichthyological reference for the region.

In 1988, marine biologist Hans Fricke was the first to photograph the species in its natural habitat, 180 metres (590 ft) off Grand Comoro's west coast.

=== Second species in Indonesia ===
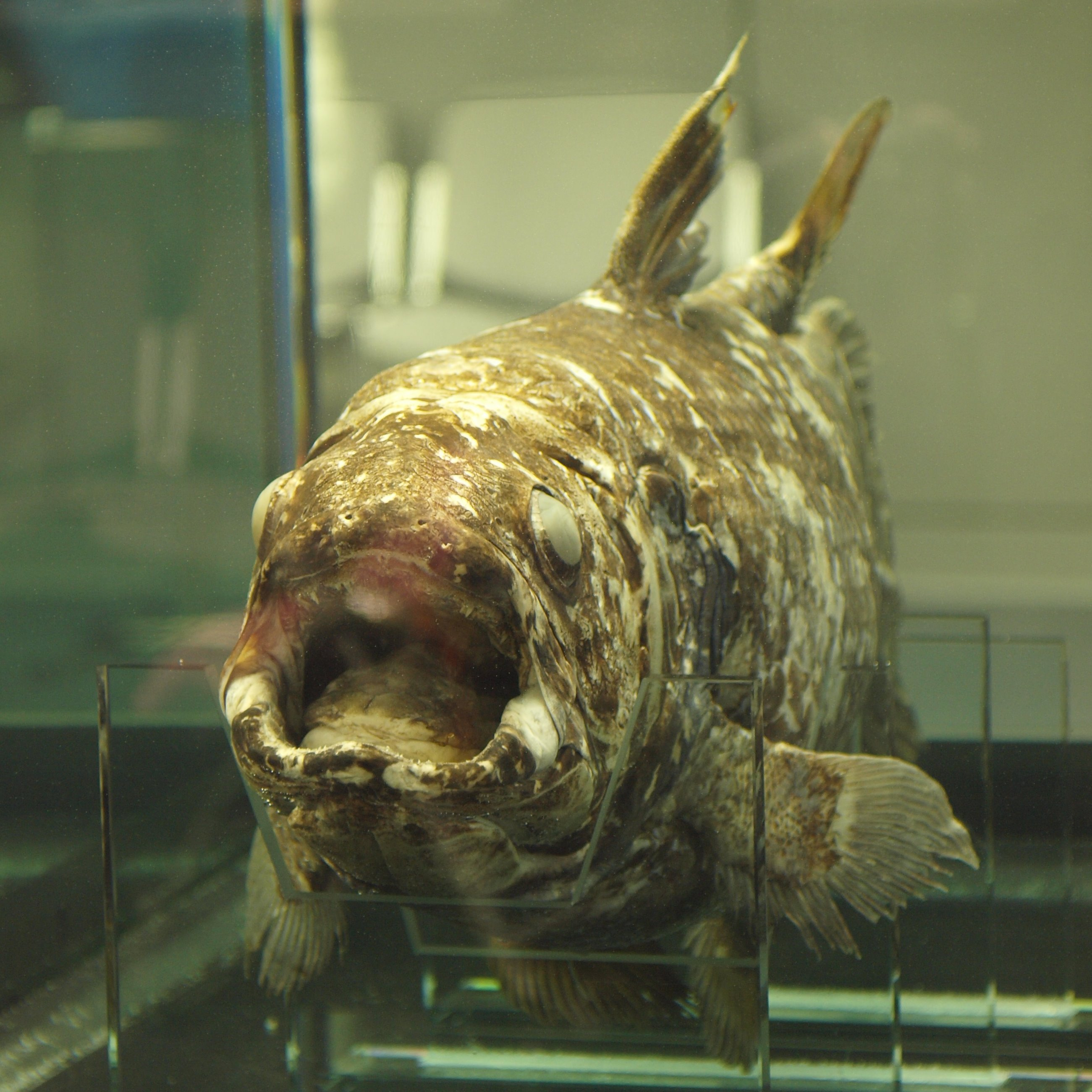
Preserved Latimeria menadoensis, Tokyo Sea Life Park, Japan

On September 18, 1997, Arnaz and Mark Erdmann, traveling in Indonesia on their honeymoon, saw a strange fish enter the market at Manado Tua, on the island of Sulawesi. Mark thought it was a gombessa (Comoro coelacanth), although it was brown, not blue. An expert noticed their pictures on the Internet and realized its significance. Subsequently, the Erdmanns contacted local fishermen and asked for any future catches of the fish to be brought to them.

A second Indonesian specimen, 1.2 m in length and weighing 29 kg, was captured alive on July 30, 1998. It lived for six hours, allowing scientists to photographically document its coloration, fin movements and general behavior. The specimen was preserved and donated to the Bogor Zoological Museum, part of the Indonesian Institute of Sciences.

DNA testing revealed this specimen differed genetically from the Comorian population. Superficially, the Indonesian coelacanth, locally called raja laut (king of the sea), appears to be the same as those found in the Comoros, except the background coloration of the skin is brownish-gray rather than bluish. This fish was described in a 1999 issue of Comptes Rendus de l'Académie des sciences Paris by Pouyaud et al. It was given the scientific name Latimeria menadoensis. A recent molecular study estimated the divergence time between the two coelacanth species to be 40–30 mya.

On May 19, 2007, Justinus Lahama, an Indonesian fisherman, caught a 1.3-metre-long, 50 kg/110 pound coelacanth off the coast near Manado, on northern Sulawesi Island near Bunaken National Marine Park. After spending 30 minutes out of water, the fish, still alive, was placed in a netted pool in front of a restaurant at the edge of the sea. It survived for 17 hours. Coelacanths usually live at depths of 200–1,000 metres. The fish was filmed by local authorities swimming in the metre-deep pool, then frozen after it died. AFP claim French, Japanese and Indonesian scientists working with the French Institute for Development and Research carried out a necropsy on the coelacanth with genetic analysis to follow. The local university is now studying the carcass.

=== iSimangaliso Wetland Park in South Africa ===
In South Africa, the search continued on and off over the years. A 46-year-old diver, Rehan Bouwer, lost his life searching for coelacanths in June 1998.

On 28 October 2000, just south of the Mozambique border in Sodwana Bay in the St. Lucia Marine Protected Area, three deep-water divers, Pieter Venter, Peter Timm, and Etienne le Roux, made a dive to 104 metres and unexpectedly spotted a coelacanth.

Calling themselves "SA Coelacanth Expedition 2000", the group returned with photographic equipment and several additional members. On 27 November, after an unsuccessful initial dive the previous day, four members of the group, Pieter Venter, Gilbert Gunn, Christo Serfontein, and Dennis Harding, found three coelacanths. The largest was between 1.5 and 1.8 metres in length; the other two were from 1.0 to 1.2 metres. The fish swam head-down and appeared to be feeding from the cavern ledges. The group returned with video footage and photographs of the coelacanths.

During the dive, however, Serfontein lost consciousness, and 34-year-old Dennis Harding rose to the surface with him in an uncontrolled ascent. Harding complained of neck pains and died from a cerebral embolism while on the boat. Serfontein recovered after being taken underwater for decompression sickness treatment.

In March–April 2002, the Jago Submersible and Fricke Dive Team descended into the depths off Sodwana and observed 15 coelacanths. A dart probe was used to collect tissue samples.

=== Tanzania ===
Coelacanths have been caught off the coast of Tanzania since 2004. Two coelacanths were initially reported captured off Songo Mnara, a small island off the edge of the Indian Ocean in August 2003. A spate of 19 more specimens of these extremely rare fishes weighing between 25 and 80 kg were reported netted in the space of the next five months, with another specimen captured in January 2005. A coelacanth weighing as much as 110 kg was reported by the Observer newspaper in 2006.

Officials of the Tanga Coastal Zone Conservation and Development Programme, which has a long-term strategy for protecting the species, see a connection with the timing of the captures with trawling - especially by Japanese vessels - near the coelacanth's habitat, as within a couple of days of trawlers casting their nets, coelacanths have turned up in deep-water gill nets intended for sharks. The sudden appearance of the coelacanths off Tanzania has raised real worries about its future due to damage done to the coelacanth population by the effects of indiscriminate trawling methods and habitat damage.

Hassan Kolombo, a programme co-ordinator, said, "Once we do not have trawlers, we don't get the coelacanths, it's as simple as that." His colleague, Solomon Makoloweka, said they had been pressuring the Tanzanian government to limit trawlers' activities. He said, "I suppose we should be grateful to these trawlers, because they have revealed this amazing and unique fish population. But we are concerned they could destroy these precious things. We want the government to limit their activity and to help fund a proper research program so that we can learn more about the coelacanths and protect them."

In a March 2008 report, the Tanzania Natural Resource Forum, a local environmental nongovernmental organization, warned that a proposed port project at Mwambani Bay could threaten a coastal population of coelacanth.

== Relation to humans ==
Coelacanths are considered a poor source of food for humans and likely most other fish-eating animals, as coelacanth flesh has large amounts of oil, urea, wax esters, and other compounds that give the flesh a distinctly unpleasant flavor, make it difficult to digest, and can cause diarrhea. Their scales themselves secrete mucus, which combined with the excessive oil their bodies produce, make coelacanths a slimy food. Where the coelacanth is more common, local fishermen avoid it because of its potential to sicken consumers. As a result, the coelacanth has no real commercial value apart from being coveted by museums and private collectors.

=== Conservation ===
Because little is known about the coelacanth, the conservation status is difficult to characterize. According to Fricke et al. (1995), it is important to conserve the species. From 1988 to 1994, Fricke counted some 60 individuals of L. chalumnae on each dive. In 1995 that number dropped to 40. Even though this could be a result of natural population fluctuation, it also could be a result of overfishing. The IUCN currently classifies L. chalumnae as "critically endangered", with a total population size of 500 or fewer individuals. L. menadoensis is considered Vulnerable, with a significantly larger population size (fewer than 10,000 individuals).

The major threat towards the coelacanth is the accidental capture by fishing operations (bycatch), especially commercial deep-sea trawling. Coelacanths usually are caught when local fishermen are fishing for oilfish. Fishermen sometimes snag a coelacanth instead of an oilfish because they traditionally fish at night, when oilfish (and coelacanths) feed. Before scientists became interested in coelacanths, they were thrown back into the water if caught. Now that they are recognized as important, fishermen trade them to scientists or other officials. Before the 1980s, this was a problem for coelacanth populations. In the 1980s, international aid gave fiberglass boats to the local fishermen, which moved fishing beyond the coelacanth territories into more productive waters. Since then, most of the motors on the boats failed, forcing the fishermen back into coelacanth territory and putting the species at risk again.

Methods to minimize the number of coelacanths caught include moving fishers away from the shore, using different laxatives and malarial salves to reduce the demand for oilfish, using coelacanth models in museums to simulate live specimens, and increasing awareness of the need for conservation. In 1987 the Coelacanth Conservation Council advocated the conservation of coelacanths. The CCC has branches located in Comoros, South Africa, Canada, the United Kingdom, the U.S., Japan, and Germany. The agencies were established to help protect and encourage population growth of coelacanths.

A "deep release kit" was developed in 2014 and distributed by private initiative, consisting of a weighted hook assembly that allows a fisherman to return an accidentally caught coelacanth to deep waters where the hook can be detached once it hits the seafloor. Conclusive reports about the effectiveness of this method are still pending.

In 2002, the South African Coelacanth Conservation and Genome Resource Programme was launched to help further the studies and conservation of the coelacanth. This program focuses on biodiversity conservation, evolutionary biology, capacity building, and public understanding. The South African government committed to spending R10 million on the program. In 2011, a plan was made for a Tanga Coelacanth Marine Park to conserve biodiversity for marine animals including the coelacanth. The park was designed to reduce habitat destruction and improve prey availability for endangered species.

=== In culture ===
Because of the surprising nature of the coelacanth's discovery, they have been a frequent source of inspiration in modern artwork, craftsmanship, and literature. At least 22 countries have depicted them on their postage stamps, particularly the Comoros, which has issued 12 different sets of coelacanth stamps. The coelacanth is also depicted on the 1000 Comorian franc banknote, as well as the 5 CF coin.

Contemporary Japanese culture has taken an interest in the coelacanth, featuring it in various media projects. In the Pokémon media franchise, the Pokémon known as Relicanth is based on the coelacanth. In the video game series Animal Crossing, the coelacanth is a rare fish that can be caught by the player by fishing in the ocean.
