= Bunaken National Park =

Marine park in the north of Sulawesi island, Indonesia

- Taman Nasional Bunaken
- IUCN category II (national park)
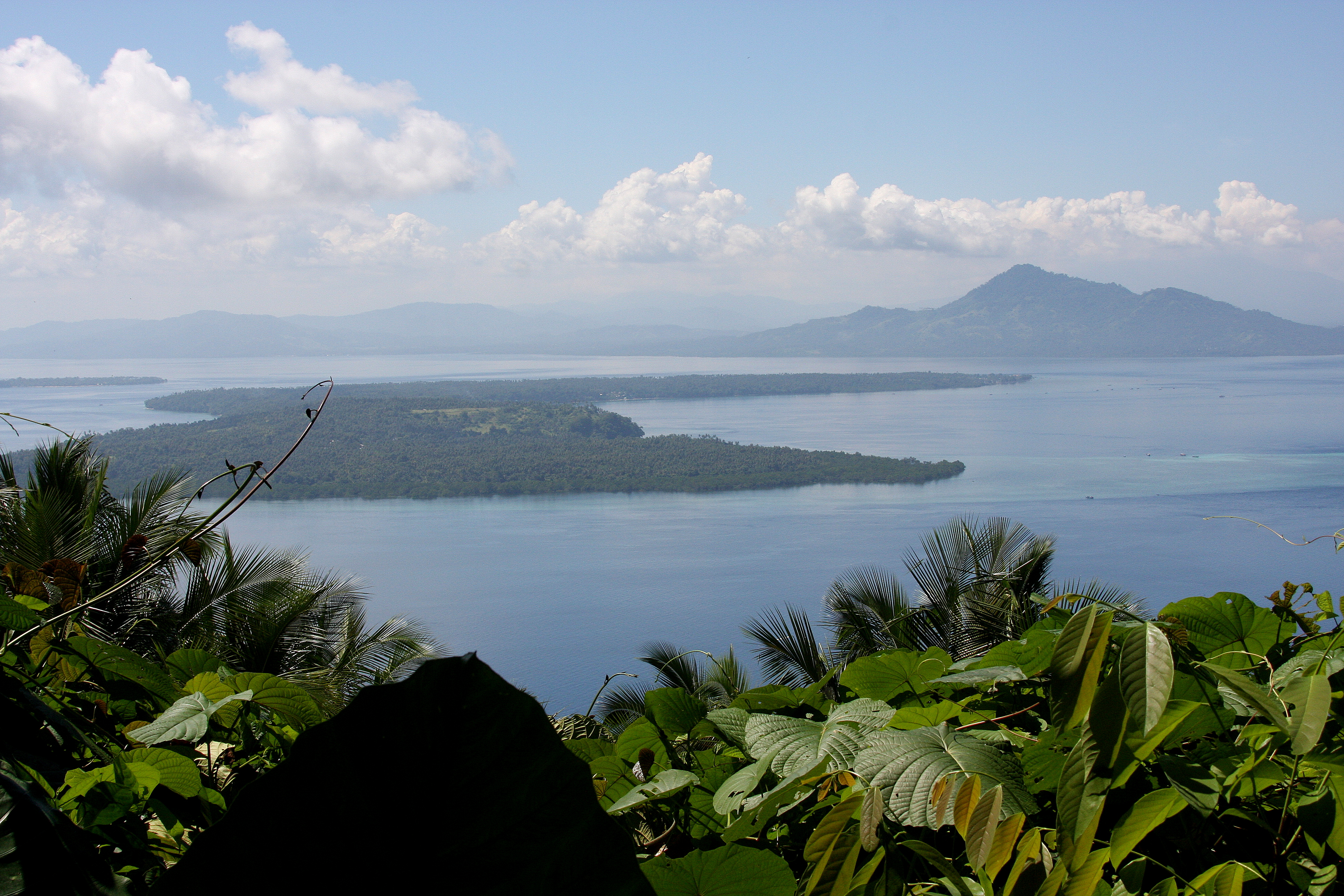
- Bunaken Island seen from Manado Tua Island.

- Location within Sulawesi
- Location: North Sulawesi, Indonesia
- Nearest city: Manado
- Coordinates: 1°40′N 124°39′E
- Area: 890 square kilometres (89,000 ha)
- Established: 1991
- Visitors: ca.35,000 (in 2003–06)
- Governing body: Ministry of Environment and Forestry

Bunaken National Park is a marine park in the north of Sulawesi Island, Indonesia. The park is located near the centre of the Coral Triangle, providing habitat to 390 species of coral as well as many fish, mollusks, reptiles and marine mammal species. The park is representative of Indonesian tropical water ecosystems, consisting of seagrass plains, coral reefs and coastal ecosystems.

It was established as a national park in 1991 and is among the first of Indonesia's growing system of marine parks. It covers a total area of 890.65 km², 97% of which is marine habitat. The remaining 3% of the park is terrestrial, including the five islands of Bunaken, Manado Tua, Mantehage, Nain, and Siladen. The southern part of the Park covers part of the Tanjung Kelapa coast.

== Geology ==
North Sulawesi is considered to be a young formation, of 5–24 million years of age. The region has undergone explosive volcanism 1.5–5 million years ago, which resulted in the volcanic tuff that characterizes the existing topography. Manado Tua is an inactive volcano formed in a classical cone shape and rising over 600 m above sea level, the highest elevation in the park. Bunaken Island also has volcanic origins with a significant amount of uplifted fossil coral. Nain Island is also a dome-shaped island, 139 m (456 ft) in height. Mantehage Island is relatively flat and seems to be sinking into the sea. The island has extensive mangrove forest flats, partially separated by saltwater channels. Siladen is a low-lying coral sand island with no significant topography. Arakan-Wawontulap and Molas-Wori on the mainland of North Sulawesi are relatively flat areas at the base of volcanic hills. The absence of a continental shelf allows the coastal area of the park to drop directly down the continental slope. The sea depth between the islands of the park is 200–1,840 m (660–6,040 ft).

== Flora and fauna ==
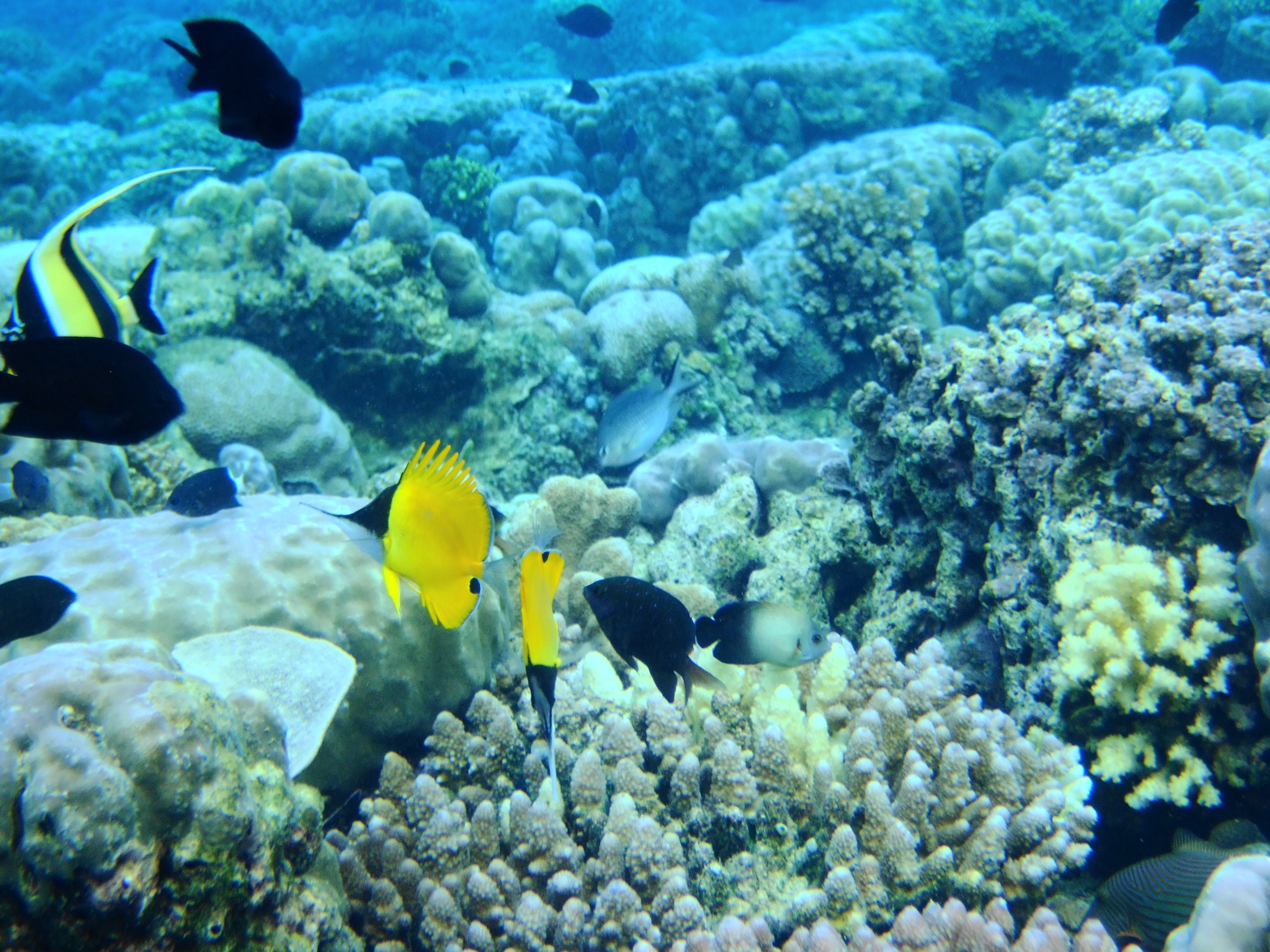
Bunaken National Marine Park

A very rich coral ecosystem covers most of Bunaken National Park, dominated by fringing reef and barrier reef corals. There are about 390 species of coral recorded in the waters of the Park. A distinct feature is a 25–50 metre vertical coral wall which is inhabited by 13 coral genera. The seaweeds that can be found here include Caulerpa, Halimeda, and Padina pavonica species. At the same time, the dominant seagrasses, in particular in the islands of Montehage and Nain, are Thalassia hemprichii, Enhallus acoroides, and Thalassodendron ciliatum. The park is also abundant in different species of fish, marine mammals, and reptiles, birds, mollusks, and mangrove species.

About 2000 species of fish live in the park waters, including the emperor angelfish, Almaco jack, spotted seahorse, bluestripe snapper, pinkish basslet, and two-lined monocle bream. The Indonesian coelacanth was first filmed in-situ off Manado Tua in 2009. Mollusks include the giant clam, horned helmet shells, and chambered nautilus; ascidians are also present.

It is claimed that this park has seven times more genera of coral than Hawaii, and more than 70% of all the known fish species of the Indo-Western Pacific.

On land, the islands are rich in species of palm, sago, woka, silar and coconut. Among the animal species that live on the land and the beaches are the Celebes crested macaque, Timor Deer, and Sulawesi bear cuscus. The mangrove forest of the Park contains, among others Rhizophora and Sonneratia species. This forest is also rich in species of crab, lobster, mollusk, and sea birds such as gulls, herons, sea doves, and storks.

== Human habitation and tourism ==
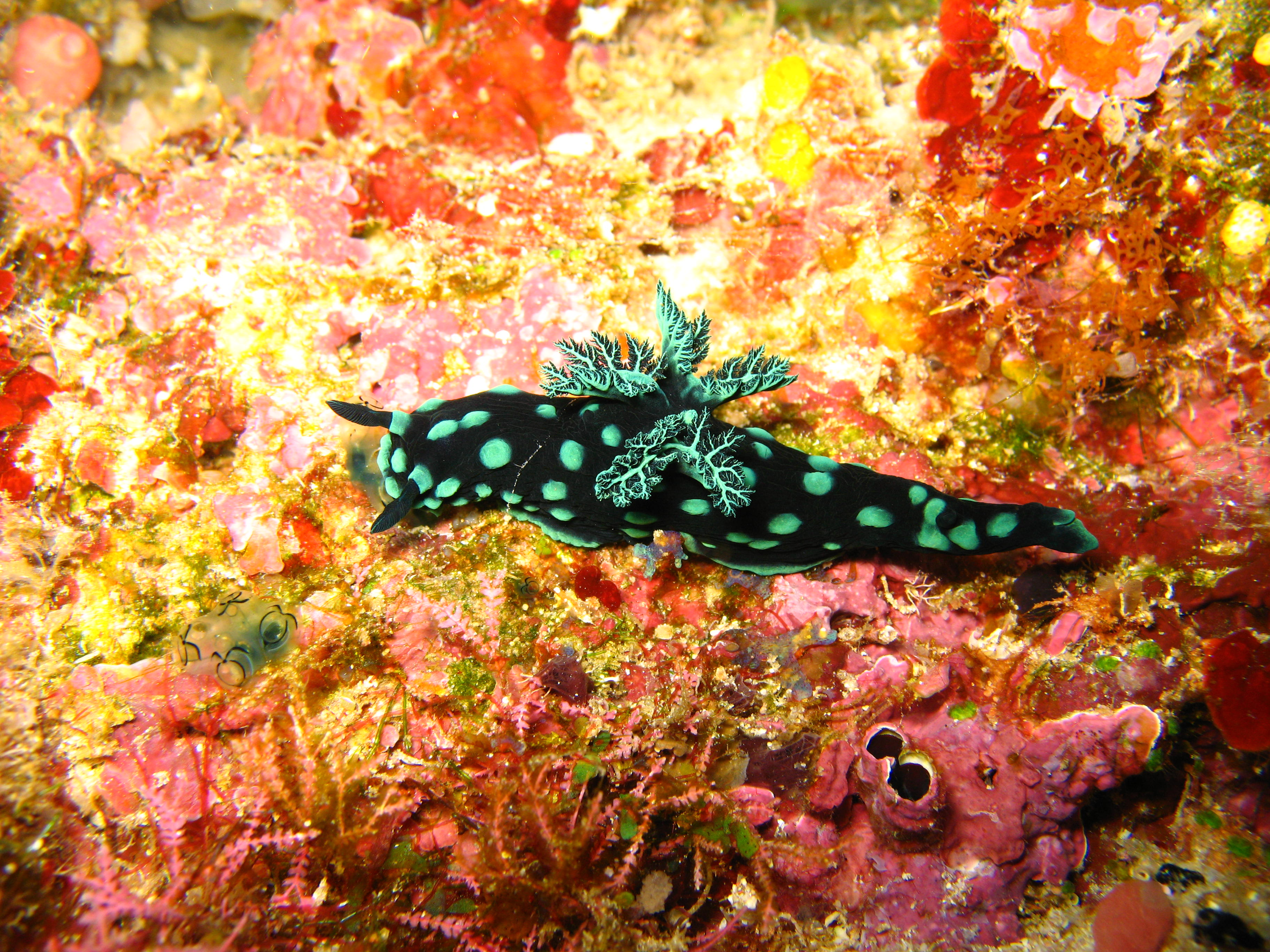
The nudibranch Nembrotha cristata, a sea slug, Bunaken National Park

The area is densely populated, with 22 villages inside the park comprising about 35,000 people. Most locals work as fishermen or farmers cultivating coconut, sweet potato, banana or seaweed for export, while a small number are employed in tourism as dive guides, boat operators, and cottage staff. Tourism is strongly developed, with accommodation ranging from backpacker cottages to 5-star resorts. Between 2003 and 2006 the number of visitors ranged from 32,000 to 39,000 of which 8,000–10,000 were international visitors for each year.

Scuba diving and snorkelling are the main activities pursued by tourists visiting the park, with the diving in Bunaken being world renowned.

== Conservation and threats ==
Bunaken National Park was formally established in 1991 and is among the first of Indonesia's marine parks. In 2005 Indonesia submitted an application to UNESCO for including the park on the World Heritage List. Despite its national park status and significant funding, the park has suffered a slow, continuous degradation due to a number of threats including coral mining, anchor damage, blast fishing, cyanide fishing, diving, and trash. The World Wildlife Fund provides conservation support in the National Park as part of the Sulu Sulawesi Marine Eco-region Action Plan. This includes participatory enforcement and patrol, which resulted in significant reduction of blast fishing. In 2024, the No-Trash Triangle Initiative set up river barriers in nearby Manado to reduce plastic waste inflow from Manado to Bunaken National Park.
