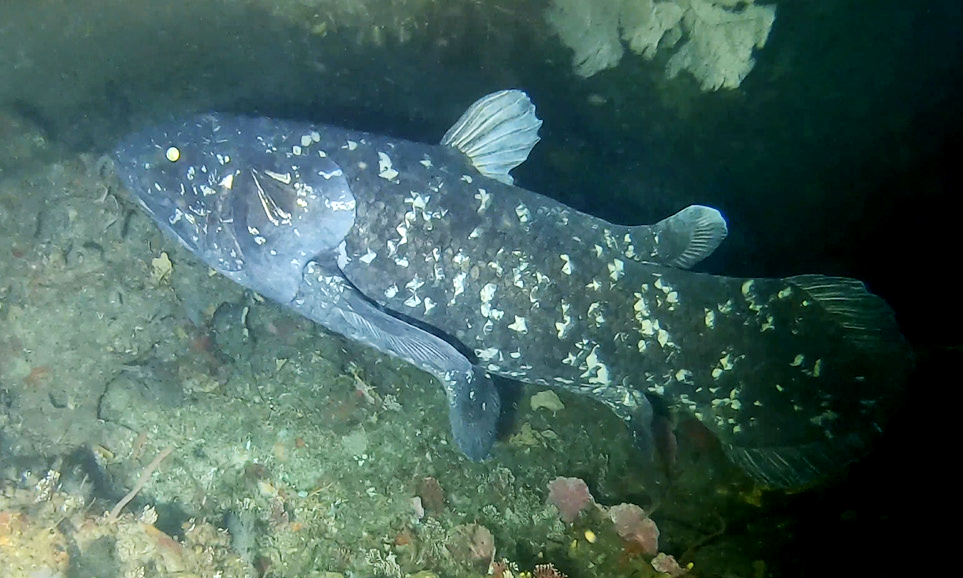
- Live individual off Pumula on the KwaZulu-Natal South Coast, South Africa

Conservation status
- Critically Endangered (IUCN 3.1)
- CITES Appendix I

Scientific classification
- Kingdom: Animalia
- Phylum: Chordata
- Class: Actinistia
- Order: Coelacanthiformes
- Suborder: Latimerioidei
- Family: Latimeriidae
- Genus: Latimeria
- Species: L. chalumnae

Binomial name
- Latimeria chalumnae J. L. B. Smith, 1939
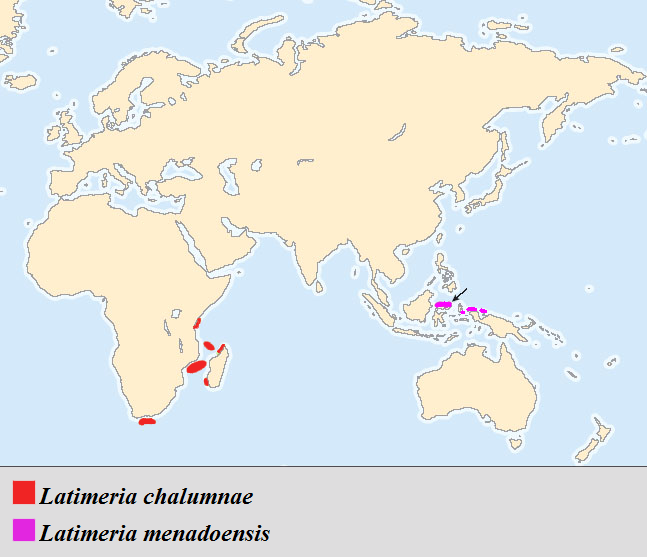
- L. chalumnae range in red

Synonyms
- Malania anjouanae Smith, 1953; Latimeria anjouanae (Smith, 1953)

= West Indian Ocean coelacanth =

Species of lobe-finned bony fish

The West Indian Ocean coelacanth (Latimeria chalumnae), sometimes known as the gombessa, African coelacanth, and simply coelacanth, is a crossopterygian, one of two extant species of coelacanth, a rare order of vertebrates more closely related to lungfish and tetrapods than to the common ray-finned fishes. The other extant species is the Indonesian coelacanth (L. menadoensis).

The West Indian Ocean coelacanth was historically known by fishermen around the Comoro Islands (where it is known as gombessa), Madagascar, and Mozambique in the western Indian Ocean, but first scientifically recognised from a specimen collected in South Africa in 1938.

This coelacanth was once thought to be evolutionarily conservative, but discoveries have shown initial morphological diversity. It has a vivid blue pigment, and is the better known of the two extant species. The species has been assessed as critically endangered on the IUCN Red List.

== Taxonomy ==
The West Indian Ocean coelacanth (Latimeria chalumnae) is allocated to the genus Latimeria, which it shares with one other species, the Indonesian coelacanth (Latimeria menadoensis). From September 1997 – July 1998, two coelacanth fish were discovered off the coast of Manado Tua Island, Sulawesi, Indonesia, different from the Latimeria chalumnae discovered near the Comores. The Indonesian coelacanth is identifiable by its brownish grey color.

=== First discovery in South Africa ===
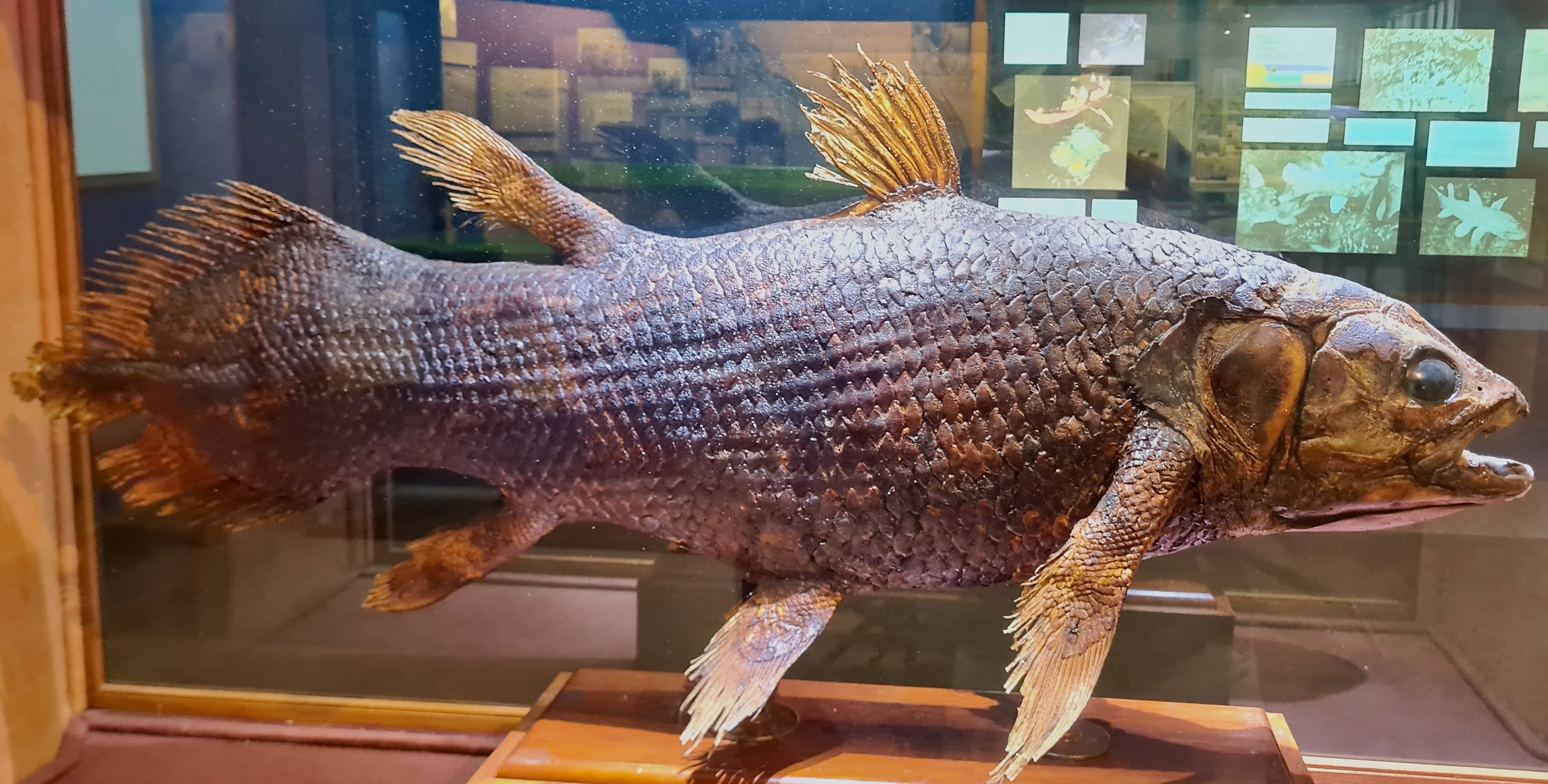
Holotype specimen in East London Museum

On December 22, 1938, Hendrik Goosen, the captain of the trawler Nerine, returned to the harbour at East London, South Africa, after a trawl between the Chalumna and Ncera Rivers. As he frequently did, he telephoned his friend, Marjorie Courtenay-Latimer, curator at East London Museum, to see if she wanted to look over the contents of the catch for anything interesting, and told her of the strange fish he had set aside for her. Correspondence in the archives of the South African Institute for Aquatic Biodiversity (SAIAB, formerly the JLB Smith Institute of Ichthyology) show that Goosen went to great lengths to avoid any damage to this fish and ordered his crew to set it aside for the East London Museum. Goosen later told how the fish was steely blue when first seen but by the time the Nerine entered East London harbour many hours later the fish had become dark grey.

Failing to find a description of the creature in any of her books, Courtenay-Latimer attempted to contact her friend, Professor J. L. B. Smith, but he was away for Christmas. Unable to preserve the fish, she reluctantly sent it to a taxidermist. When Smith returned, he immediately recognized it as a coelacanth, known to science only from fossils. Smith named the fish Latimeria chalumnae in honor of Marjorie Courtenay-Latimer and the waters in which it was found. The two discoverers received immediate recognition, and the fish became known as a "living fossil". The 1938 coelacanth is still on display in the East London Museum.

However, as the specimen had been stuffed, the gills and skeleton were not available for examination, and some doubt therefore remained as to whether it was truly the same species. Smith began a hunt for a second specimen that would take more than a decade.

The West Indian Ocean coelacanth was later found to be known to fishermen of the Grande Comore and Anjouan Islands, which it inhabits the slopes of, at depths between 150 and 700 meters (500 and 2,300 ft).

=== The second specimen, Malania anjouanae ===
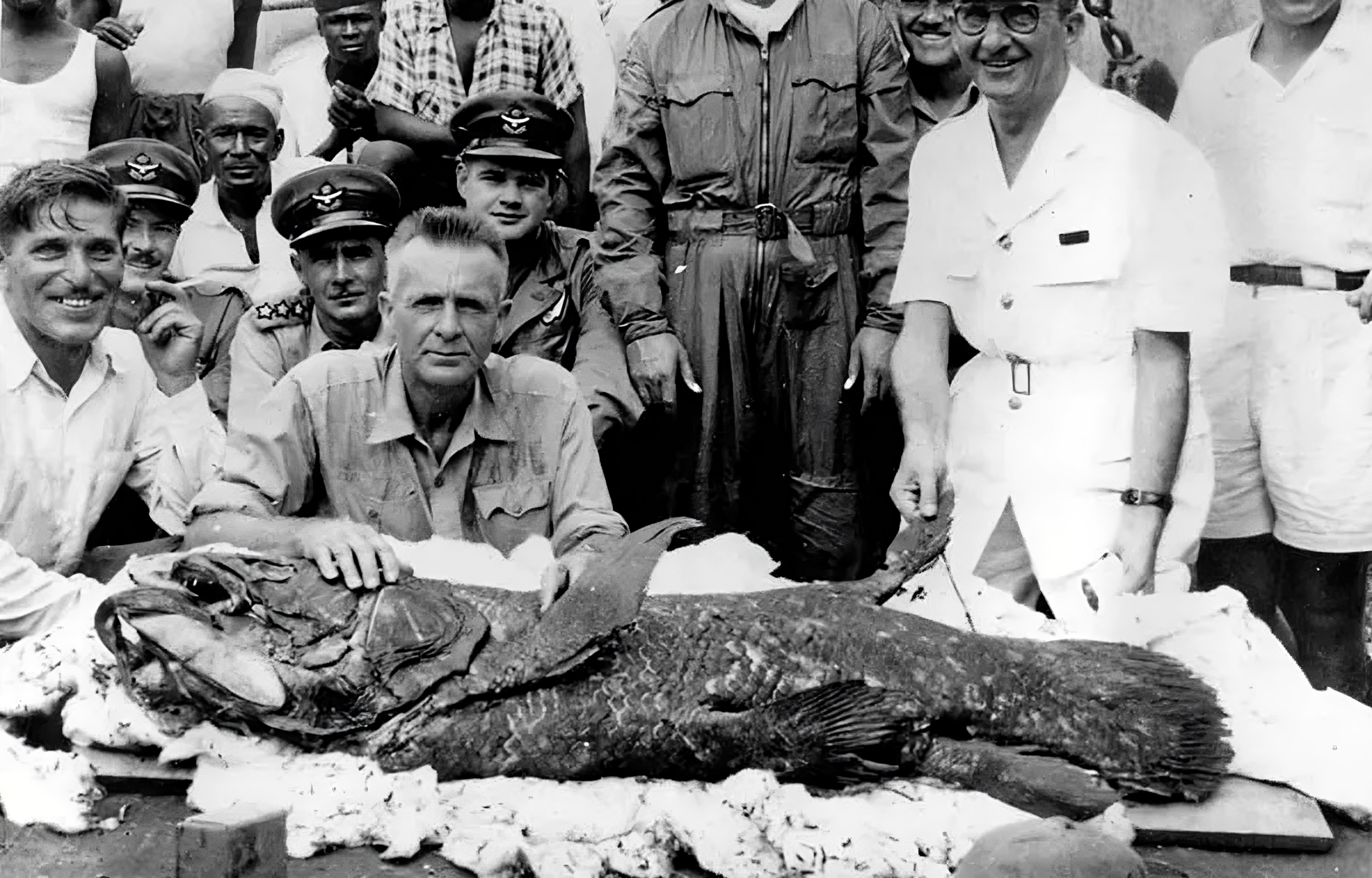
Second specimen after capture in 1952

A second specimen with a missing dorsal fin and deformed tail fin was captured in 1952 off the coast of Anjouan (Comoros). At the time it was believed to be a new species and placed in a new genus as well, Malania, named in honour of the Prime Minister of South Africa at the time, Daniel François Malan, without whose help the specimen would not have been preserved with its muscles and internal organs more or less intact. It has since been accepted as Latimeria chalumnae.

=== Genetics ===
The genome of Latimeria chalumnae was sequenced in 2013 to provide insight into tetrapod evolution. The coelacanths were long believed to be the closest relatives to the first tetrapods on land due to their body characteristics. However, genetic sequencing proved that the lungfishes are in fact the closest relatives to land tetrapods. The full sequence and annotation of the entry is available on the Ensembl genome browser.

== Anatomy and physiology ==
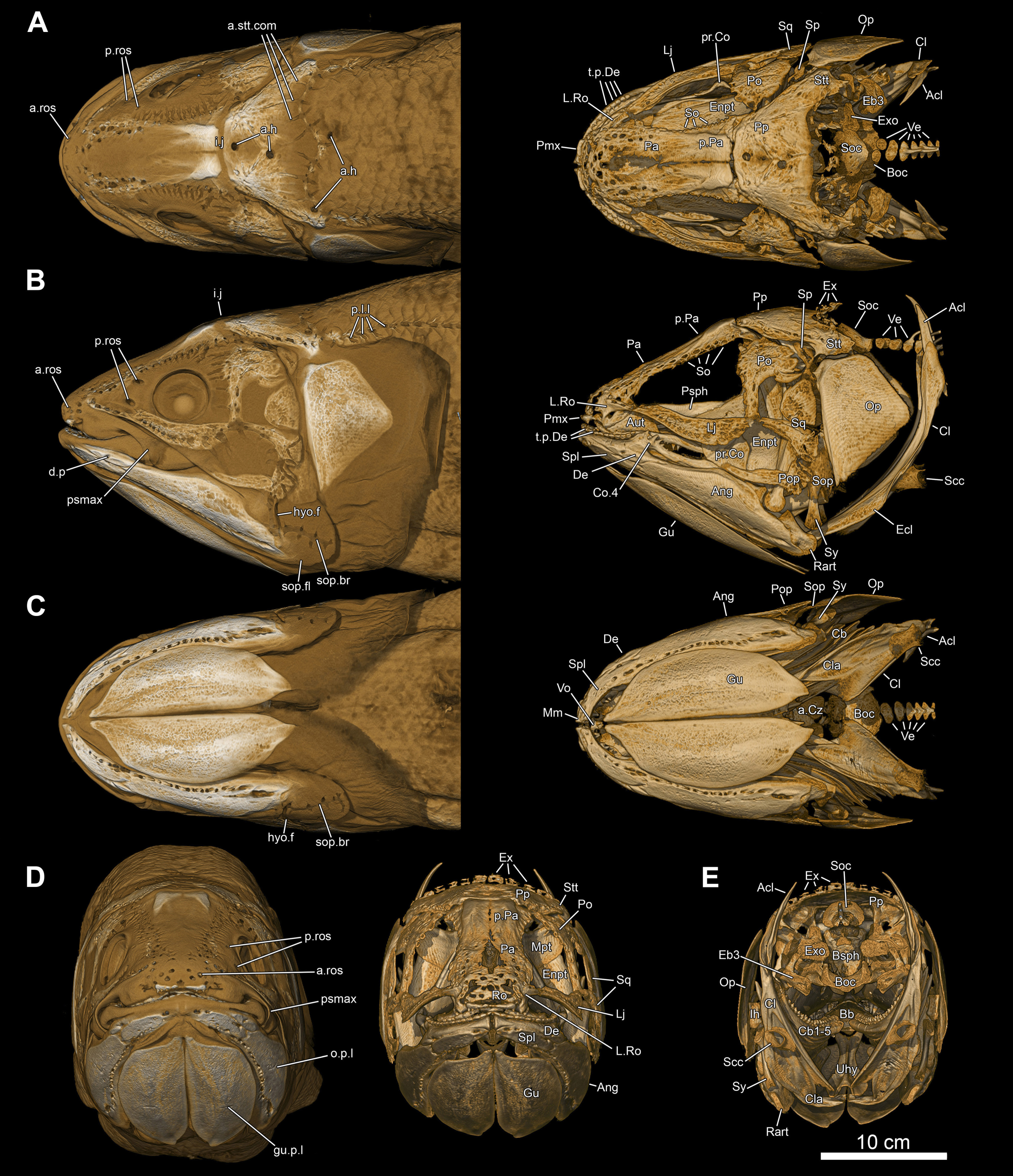
Micro CT scanned skull of a 1.16 metre long male L. chalumnae

Latimeria chalumnae grows up to 1.68 metres (5 ft 6 in) long for males and 2 metres (6 ft 7 in) total length for females, with a maximum known weight of 95 kilograms (209 lb), but averages around 45 kg (99 lb) and 1.5 metres (4 ft 11 in) long.

The species exhibits a deep royal blue color with spots used as a camouflage tactic for hunting prey. Similar anatomical adaptations include the abundance of visual cells such as rods to help see when light is limited. This combined with the West Indian Ocean coelacanth's large eyes aid seeing in dark water. Latimeria chalumnae also have choroidal tapetum lucidum, which reflects light through the retina and increases the fraction of light absorbed by its visual pigments.

Similar to cartilaginous fish, Latimeria chalumnae has a rectal gland, pituitary gland, pancreas, and spinal cord. To balance osmotic pressure, these fish adopt an efficient mechanism of osmoregulation by retaining urea in their blood.

Latimeria chalumnae are an ovoviviparous species, retaining their eggs internally until they hatch. They also have low fecundity due to their long gestation period of around 12 months, though not much is known about their age of sexual maturity.

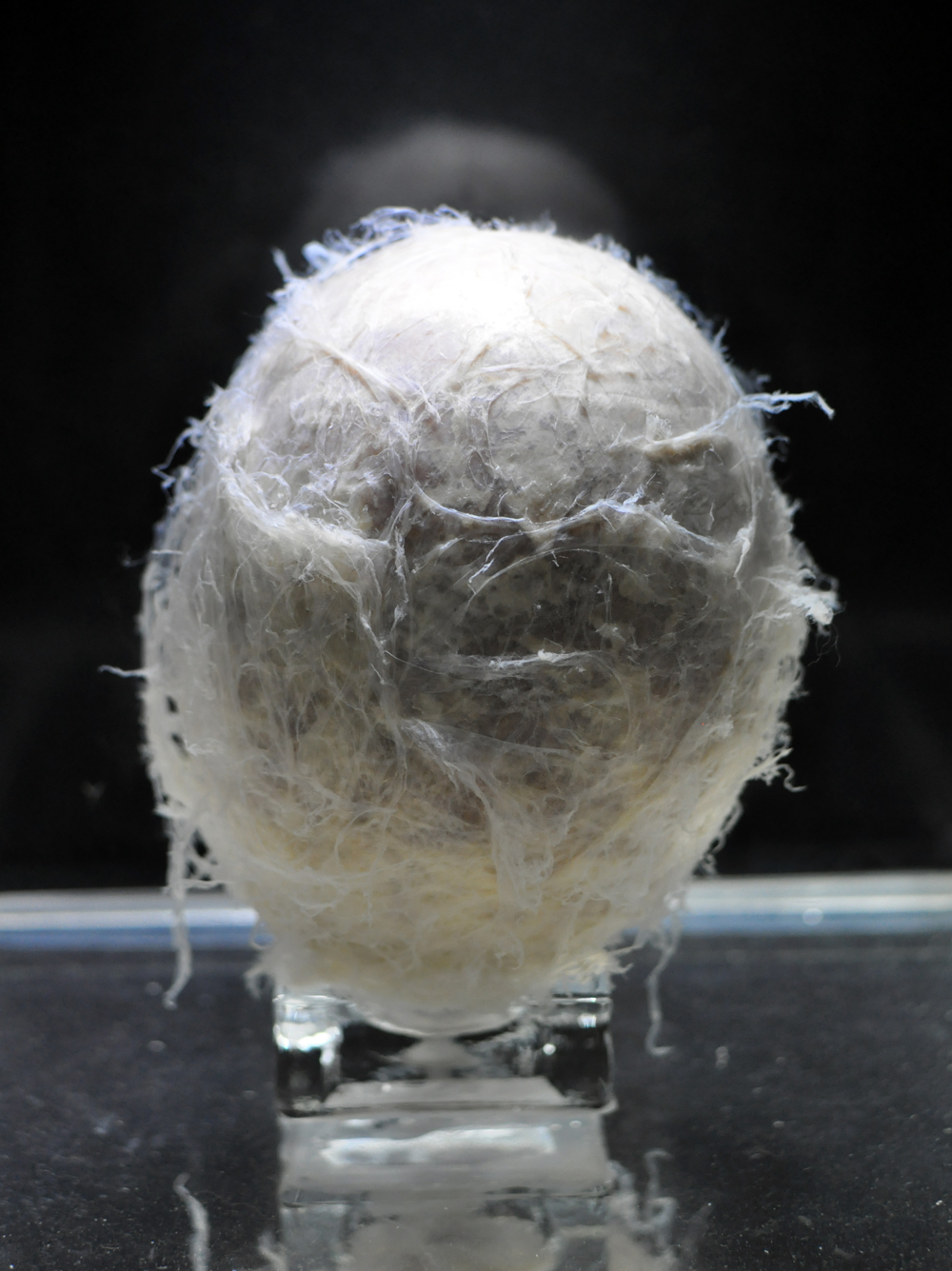
Egg

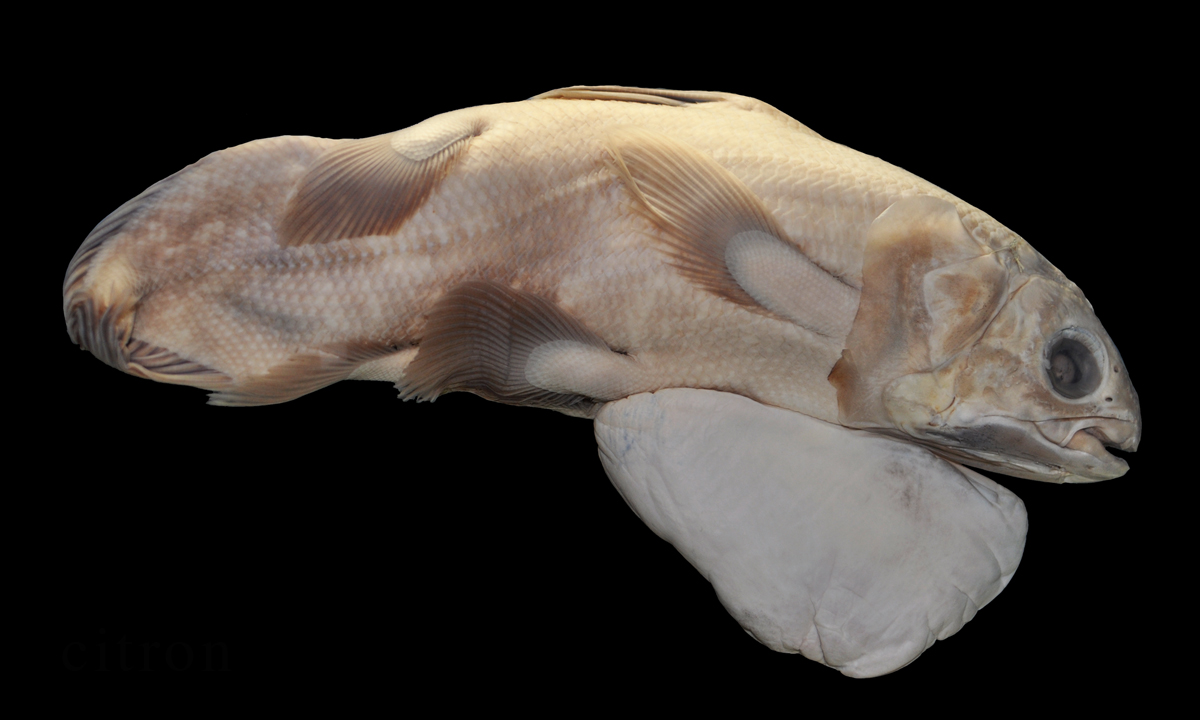
Embryo

== Habitat and behavior ==
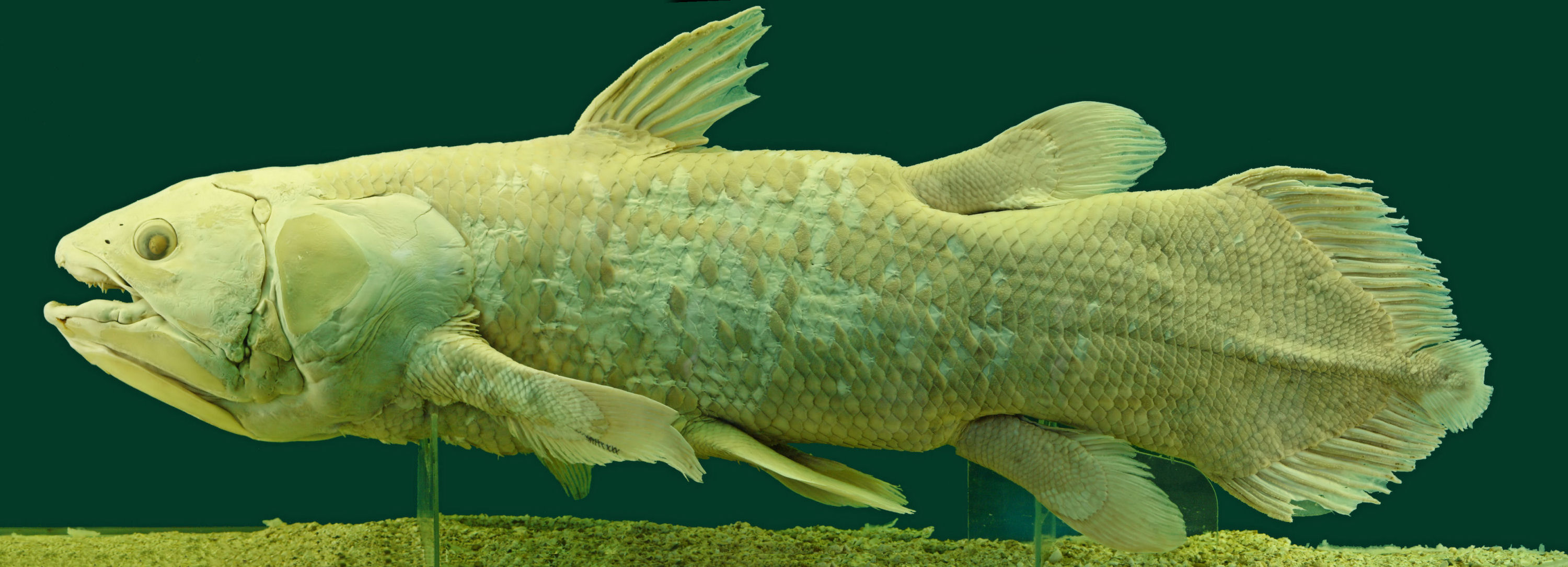
Preserved specimen of Latimeria chalumnae in the Natural History Museum, Vienna, Austria [length: 170 cm (67 in) – weight: 60 kg (130 lb)]. This specimen was caught on 18 October 1974, next to Salimani/Selimani (Grand Comoro, Comoro Islands) 11°48′40.7″S 43°16′3.3″E.

L. chalumnae are usually found between 70–140 m (230–460 ft) of depth, but are sometimes found as deep as 243 m (797 ft) and as shallow as 54 metres (177 ft). L. chalumnae tend to reside in underwater caves, which are most common at these depths. This may limit their maximum depth range, along with lack of prey. They are known to spend the daytime within these lava caves, likely for protection from predators, and use the surrounding feeding grounds at night. Coelacanths are opportunistic in their feeding. Some of their known prey species are fish that include: Amioides polyacanthus, Beryx splendens, Lucigadus ori and Brotula multibarbata. Their intracranial joint and associated basicranial muscle likely play an important but unresolved role in feeding.

Some individuals have been seen performing "headstands" as feeding behavior, allowing coelacanth to slurp prey from crevices within lava caves. This behavior is made possible due to the coelacanth's ability to move both its upper and lower jaw, which is a unique trait in extant vertebrates that have bone skeletons.

== Population and conservation ==
L. chalumnae is widely but very sparsely distributed around the rim of the western Indian Ocean, from South Africa northward along the East African coast, especially the Tanga Region of Tanzania to Kenya, the Comoros, and Madagascar, seemingly occurring in small colonies. In 1991, it was estimated that 2–5 coelacanths were accidentally caught each year from Grand Comoro, making up about 1% of its population. Between 1991 and 1994, there was an estimated 30% total population reduction of the coelacanth. In 1998, the total population of the West Indian Ocean coelacanth was estimated to have been 500 or fewer, a number that would threaten the survival of the species. Near Grand Comoro, an island northwest of Madagascar, a maximum of 370 individuals reside. L. chalumnae is listed as critically endangered by IUCN. In accordance with the Convention on International Trade of Endangered Species treaty, the coelacanth was added to Appendix I (threatened with extinction) in 1989. The treaty forbids international trade for commercial purposes and regulates all trade, including sending specimens to museums, through a system of permits.

== See also ==
- Indonesian coelacanth (Latimeria menadoensis)
