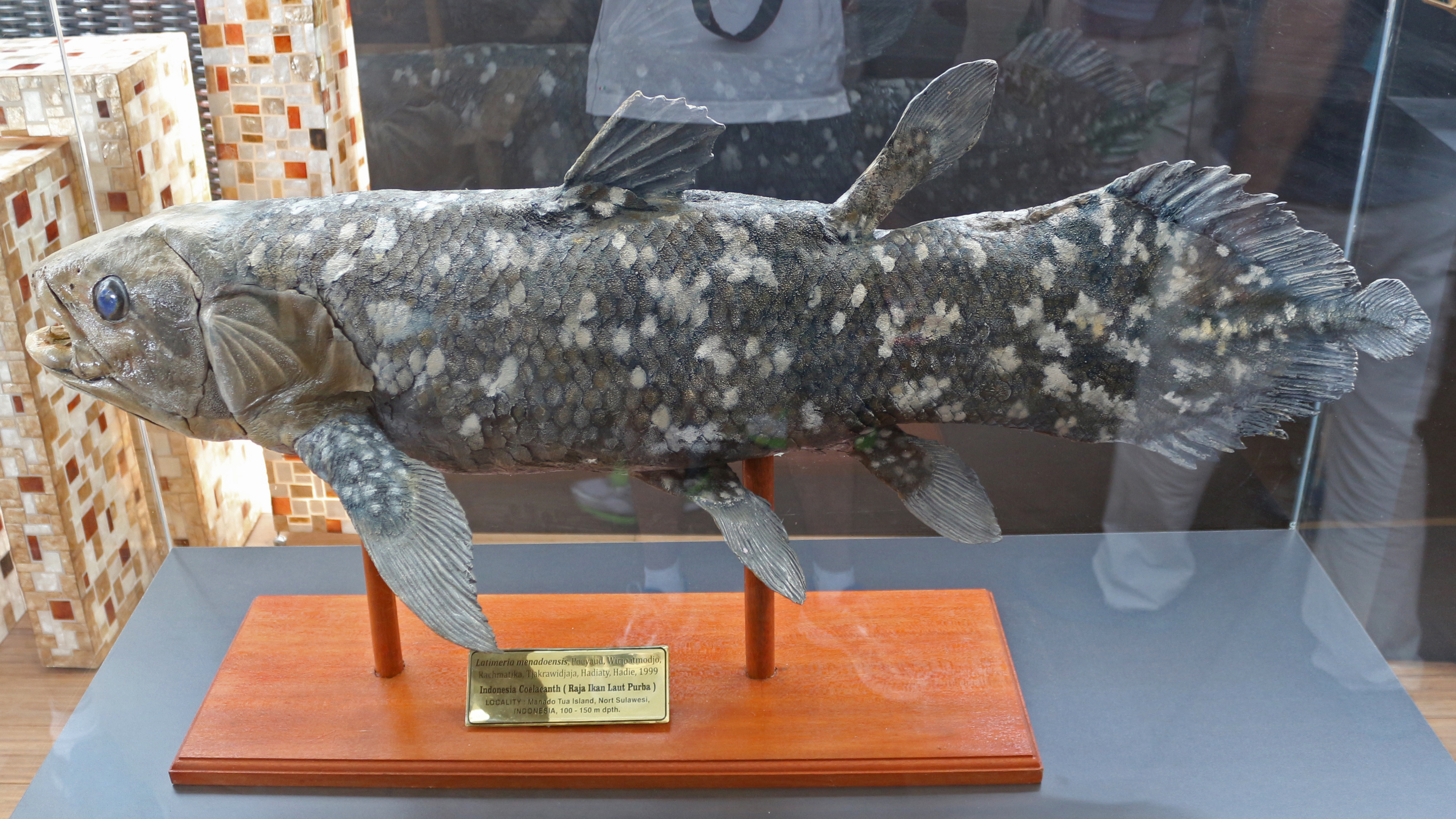
- Specimen in the Indonesian Pavilion during Expo 2015, Milan, Italy

Conservation status
- Vulnerable (IUCN 3.1)
- CITES Appendix I

Scientific classification
- Kingdom: Animalia
- Phylum: Chordata
- Class: Actinistia
- Order: Coelacanthiformes
- Suborder: Latimerioidei
- Family: Latimeriidae
- Genus: Latimeria
- Species: L. menadoensis

Binomial name
- Latimeria menadoensis Pouyaud, Wirjoatmodjo, Rachmatika, Tjakrawidjaja, Hadiaty & Hadie, 1999
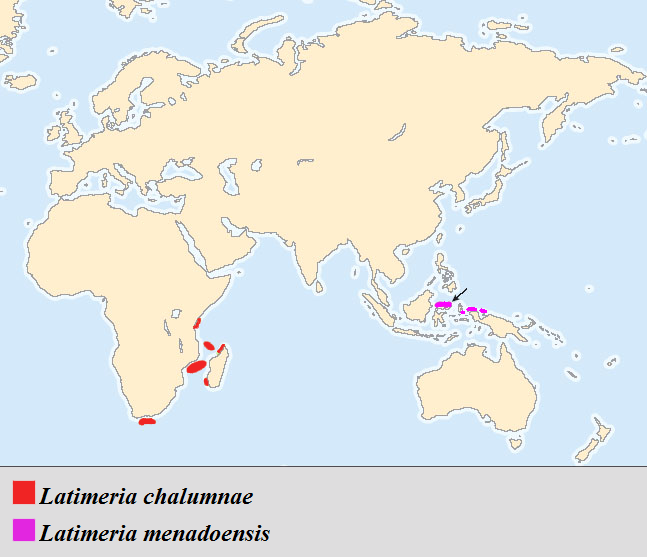
- L. menadoensis range in violet

= Indonesian coelacanth =

Species of coelacanth

The Indonesian coelacanth (Latimeria menadoensis, Indonesian: raja laut, English: king of the sea), also called Sulawesi coelacanth, is one of two living species of coelacanth, identifiable by its brown color. Latimeria menadoensis is a lobe-finned fish belonging to the class Actinistia and order Coelacanthiformes, classified under the family Latimeriidae and genus Latimeria. As a deep-sea predator, this species plays a crucial role in maintaining the balance of marine ecosystems.

Separate populations of the Indonesian coelacanth are found in the waters of north Sulawesi, Papua, Southwest Papua, and North Maluku, which may be genetically distinct. This species offers insights into the early existence of fish and the first tetrapods.

It is listed as vulnerable by the IUCN, and it was quickly given protected status under Indonesian National Law Number 7/1999 after its discovery. The other species of coelacanth, the West Indian Ocean coelacanth, is listed as critically endangered.

== Discovery ==
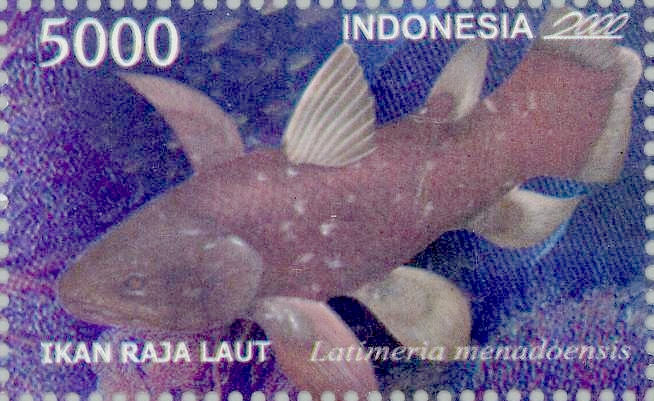
Latimeria menadoensis featured in Indonesian stamp

On September 18, 1997, Arnaz and Mark Erdmann, traveling in Indonesia on their honeymoon, saw a strange fish in a market at Manado Tua, on the island of Sulawesi. Mark Erdmann thought it was a gombessa (Comoro coelacanth), although it was brown, not blue. Erdmann took only a few photographs of the fish before it was sold. After confirming that the discovery was unique, Erdmann returned to Sulawesi in November 1997, interviewing fishermen to look for further examples. In July 1998, a fisherman Om Lameh Sonatham caught a second Indonesian specimen, 1.2 m in length and weighing 29 kg on July 30, 1998, and handed the fish to Erdmann. The fish was barely alive, but it lived for six hours, allowing Erdmann to photographically document its coloration, fin movements and general behavior. The specimen was preserved and donated to the Bogor Zoological Museum, part of the Indonesian Institute of Sciences. Erdmann's discovery was announced in Nature in September 1998.

The fish collected by Erdmann was described in a 1999 issue of Comptes Rendus de l'Académie des sciences Paris by Pouyaud et al.. It was given the scientific name Latimeria menadoensis (named after Manado where the specimen was found). The description and its naming were published without the involvement or knowledge of Erdmann, who had been independently conducting research on the specimen at the time. In response to Erdmann's complaints, Pouyaud and two other scientists asserted in a submission to Nature that they had been aware of the new species since 1995, predating the 1997 discovery. However the supplied photographic evidence of the purported earlier specimen, supposedly collected off southwest Java, was recognised as a crude forgery by the editorial team and the claim was never published.

Its geographic distribution is known to be largely confined to Indonesia, and most of the recorded species sightings are reported off North Sulawesi. Some of the areas include Talise Island, Gangga Island as well as Manado Bay. The species has also been found off the southern coast of Biak Island in northern New Guinea. With the discovery of Latimeria menadoensis found in Indonesian waters, researchers have suggested that this area could be the point of origin of all the coelacanths.

== Description ==
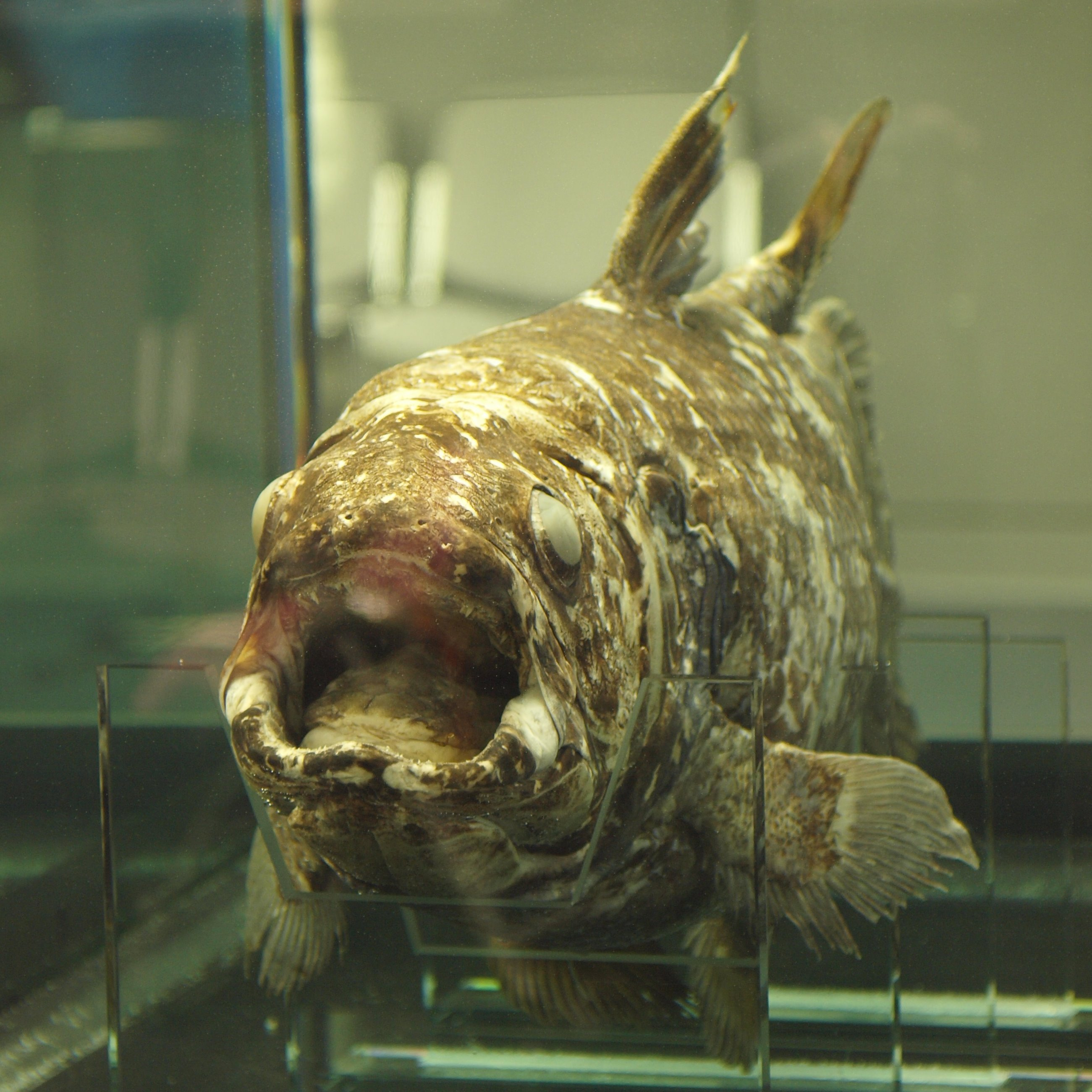
A preserved Latimeria menadoensis, Tokyo Sea Life Park, Japan

Superficially, the Indonesian coelacanth, known locally as raja laut ("king of the sea"), appears to be the same as those found in the Comoros except that the background coloration of the skin is brownish-gray rather than bluish. It has the same white mottling pattern as the West Indian Ocean coelacanth, but with flecks over the dorsal surface of its body and fins that appear golden due to the reflection of light. It may grow to 1.4 meters long and about 31–51 kg. These two species also reflect their taxa in certain morphological characteristics, especially in their pectoral and pelvic fin–like structure and in their oil-filled notochord instead of a vertebral spine. It also has unique hollow fin rays which adds to the coelacanth's image as a living fossil. It has also a considerable adipose-filled swim bladder for the control of buoyancy and an intracranial articulation which facilitates the jaw movement during feeding. The head is large relative to the size of the body weighing 27–29% of the total body length. Compared to its African counterpart, Latimeria menadoensis has longer pectoral fins and shorter pelvic fins with fewer second dorsal and pelvic fin rays. The species' arrangement of teeth has sharply curved small premaxillary teeth used in slicing its food and several smaller teeth with fang-like large palatopterygoids. It is thought that this makes it easier to capture and constrain prey in the extreme conditions of the deep sea.

Adult coelacanths, although less frequently sighted or captured than in the past, are still reasonably well-known, whereas juvenile specimens are rarely reported or sampled, resulting in a lack of understanding of their development and sexual maturity. Among the few known juvenile specimens, there are some differences, such as slender bodies, small eyes, large fin bases, and long fins in comparison with the adult fish. There is white coloration on the dorso-posterial portion of the first dorsal fin and at the terminal margins of the lobe of the caudal fins are conspicuous in juvenile fish. The species has lobed fins that move in a distinct pattern, differing from most fish species. This swimming style is thought to represent an evolutionary link between aquatic and terrestrial locomotion. The species also demonstrates extreme stenothermy, maintaining a very slow metabolic rate in its deep-sea environment. This adaptation conserves energy in a habitat where food may be scarce, and temperatures are low.

DNA analysis has shown that the specimen obtained by Erdmann differed genetically from the Comorian population. In 2005, a molecular study estimated the divergence time between the Indonesian and Comorian coelacanth species to be 30–40 mya. The two species show a 4.28% overall difference in their nucleotides.

An analysis of a specimen recovered from Waigeo, West Papua in eastern Indonesia indicates that there may be another lineage of the Indonesian coelacanth, and the two lineages may have diverged 13 million years ago. Whether this new lineage represents a subspecies or a new species has yet to be determined.

== Reproduction and mating ==
The Indonesian coelacanth is thought to be ovoviviparous, but no females of this species containing eggs or embryos have been taken. Coelacanths take about three years to reach maturity in most species, and their gestation period lasts for about three years – the longest of any vertebrate. The juveniles may emerge at around 30 cm in length. This reproductive strategy leads to production of few offspring, usually between five and twenty five embryos in each reproductive cycle. Mating is believed to be monogamous, indicating that only the male attended the area to mate with the female. The population of Indonesian coelacanths is believed to be quite small. To this date, fewer than ten have been officially documented and out of them, only 3 and 5 are recorded. Such a low number of observations is indicative of the rarity of the species and the challenges involved in studying it.

== Age and growth ==
Coelacanths are characterized to grow at a slow rate and live for many years. It is estimated they have a life expectancy of up to 100 years, with claims of an average age of over 60 years. However, due to a small number of obtained specimens, information surrounding the ageing and growth process of the Indonesian coelacanth is limited. The structures used to estimate age and growth in coelacanths are not explicitly known, but in many fish species, otoliths and fin rays are commonly used for this purpose.

== Behavior ==
Due to its habitat, there has been limited observations surrounding the Indonesian coelacanth's behaviour. This species is known to be nocturnal so it carries out most of its activities at night to forage for food. Juvenile coelacanths were found in similar geographical locations as adult coelacanths, such as long and narrow overhangs. This implies that the species probably breeds in a limited extent within its geographic extent.

== Habitat ==
Geological obstacles and ocean currents most likely have an impact on the distribution of the Indonesian coelacanths, which are restricted to particular areas of the country (in contrast, L. chalumnae is found throughout the western Indian Ocean). Living in the lightless depths of the ocean, the Indonesian coelacanth has certain visual adaptations. They appear to be more sensitive to blue light at 480 nm, a typical wavelength in the black, restricted habitation of this animal. This adaptation has undergone further shift, together with the expansion of the rostral organ, which can detect electrical signals, enables the coelacanth to move and feed in the dark environment. It is speculated by the researchers that such evolution process in the deep-sea ecosystems might have started at about 200 million years ago. Teams of researchers using submersibles have recorded live sightings of the fish in the waters of Manado Tua and the Talise islands off north Sulawesi as well as in the waters of Biak in Papua. These areas share similar steep rocky topography full of caves, which are the habitat of the fish. These coelacanths live in deep waters of around 150 metres or more, at a temperature between 14 and 18 degrees Celsius.

This species is associated with deep waters, and their occurrence ranges from 100 to 700 meters under the water surface. Despite its presence and the depth range in Indonesia, the habitat selection of the Indonesian coelacanth is biased towards certain geographic territories. It is most often related to elevated slopes at the bottom of the ocean and underwater grottos and cliffs. The temperatures of the waters in these habitats are usually in the range of 12.4–20.5 °C ^{[21] [28]}. However, Latimeria menadoensis will be more inclined to inhabiting a more stochastic (random) environment than the African counterpart known as Latimeria chalumnae.

== Diet ==
The Indonesian coelacanth is a carnivore that feeds primarily on benthopelagic fish (such as flounder, rays, and halibut) and epibenthopelagic organisms (phytoplankton, zooplankton, jellyfish crabs, sea turtles, sea birds). Their food preference is mainly deep sea fish and cephalopods, making them carnivorous. They also engage in ambush predation. While hunting, coelacanths have been observed to swim with their heads directed upwards in what is thought to be headstand posturing which is the most energy efficient. The conservation of energy is essential due to their relatively slow metabolic rates, a consequence of living in a deep-sea habitat.

== Conservation status ==
Latimeria menadoensis is classified as a vulnerable species due to its limited distribution, small population size, and threat from bycatch in deep-sea fishing. After the discovery of the species, less than 10 examples have been recorded in Indonesia, which points to low population density. Its habitat specialization and the small known geographic range moreover made L. menadoensis vulnerable to local extinction threats. The fish is legally protected through the Minister of Forestry Regulation No. 7/1999. However, it continued to be caught by local fishermen; on November 5, 2014, a fisherman found a specimen in his net, the seventh Indonesian coelacanth found in Indonesian waters since 1998. Additionally, in 2000, the species became listed in CITES appendix I list meaning that it cannot be traded internationally. These measures establish the scientific and cultural importance of the coelacanth in the greatest way possible. It has now assumed a huge social significance in Indonesia where it is a point of local and national pride and is the emblematic species for marine conservation in the Southeast Asia. DNA studies and habitat conservation research are ongoing, and marine protected areas have been established ^{.}

The species suffers various threats, particularly deep-water fishing, increased siltation of the habitat, and pollution. Increased human activity specifically along the coastal shelf may lead to enhanced sedimentation and a decrease in the quantity and quality of the complex deep sea structures the coelacanths depend on. Although there are notable climate changes and changes in the ocean temperature, there is still not enough information about how it affects their ecosystem. The greatest danger to the species may be that it is being caught as bycatch in deep-set gillnets that are meant for shark capturing. As a counteraction, certain measures were implemented in Bunaken National Park, including the regulations that prohibited the usage of those nets, and no more coelacanths were caught in the area. There are no specific fisheries to target the coelacanth, and even though the species is inedible, there have been instances of foreign buyers attempting to lure fishers to catch the fish, most likely for a museum or to be put in a display tank in an aquarium.

== See also ==
- West Indian Ocean coelacanth (Latimeria chalumnae)
