= Natural History Museum of Nantes =

Natural history museum in Nantes, France

- Muséum d'histoire naturelle de Nantes
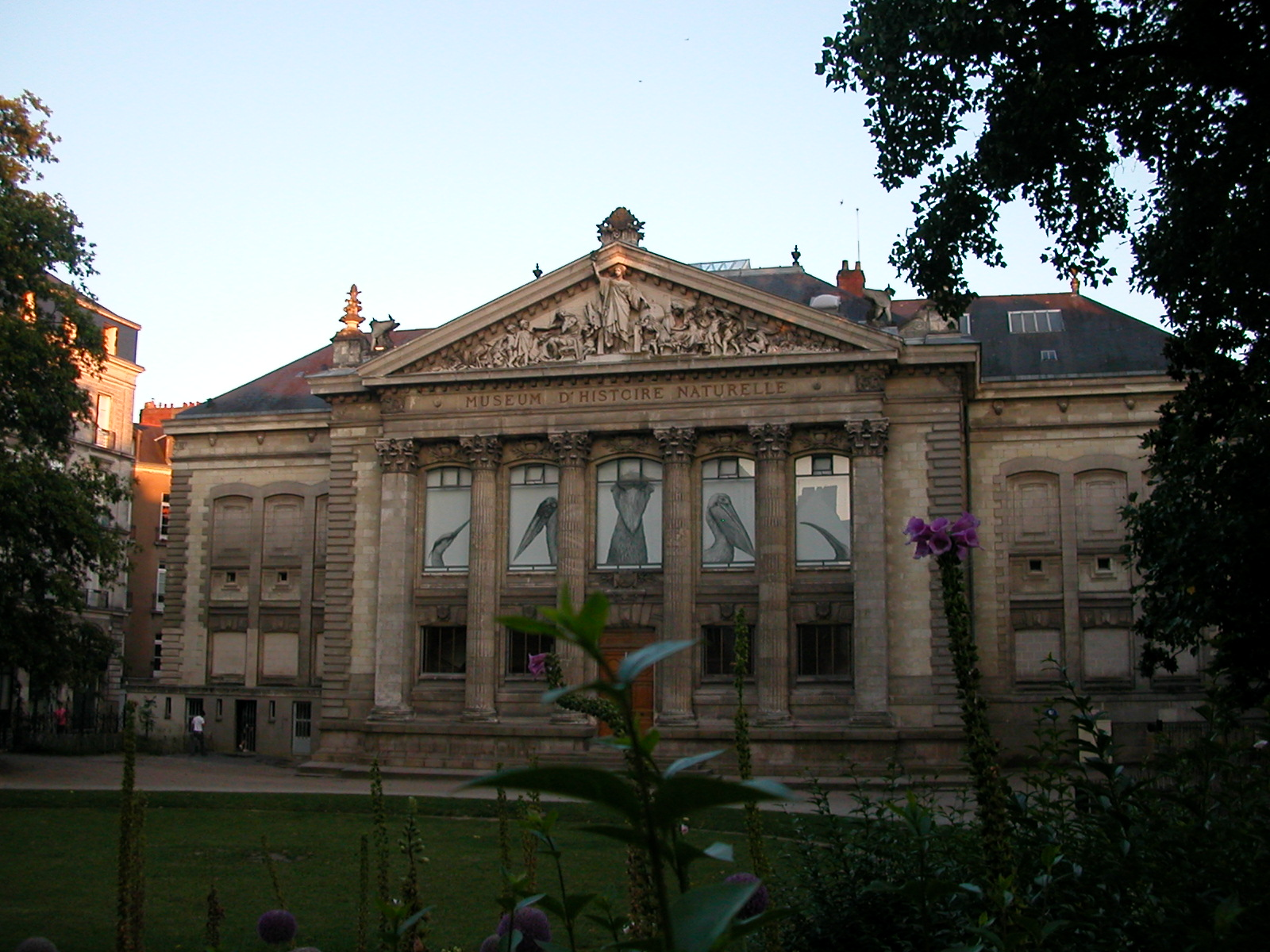
- Muséum d'histoire naturelle de Nantes
- Established: 1793
- Location: Nantes, France
- Coordinates: 47.212856°N 1.564988°W
- Type: Natural history
- Website: www.museum.nantes.fr

The Natural History Museum of Nantes is a French natural history museum located in the city of Nantes.

== History ==
The first place dedicated to natural history in Nantes was a private cabinet created in 1799 by François-René Dubuisson, a pharmacist, natural history lover.

From 1836 to 1863, Dubuisson's successor was Frédéric Cailliaud (1787–1869), who added a collection of natural sciences.

A vivarium was created there in 1955 to exhibit live animals. In 1970, the departure of the Nantes business school, which had occupied part of the premises of the former Hôtel de la Monnaie since its creation in 1900, finally allowed the museum, whose expansion had then become essential, to integrate the building by incorporating it into its own premises. In 1988, the study of the Marquis d'Abadie (1895–1971) was reconstructed there to present to the public the diversity of the collections bequeathed by this naturalist.

Since the early 2000s, the museum has undergone numerous renovations (the vivarium in 2003, the zoology gallery in 2008, the Earth sciences gallery in 2009).

== Gallery ==
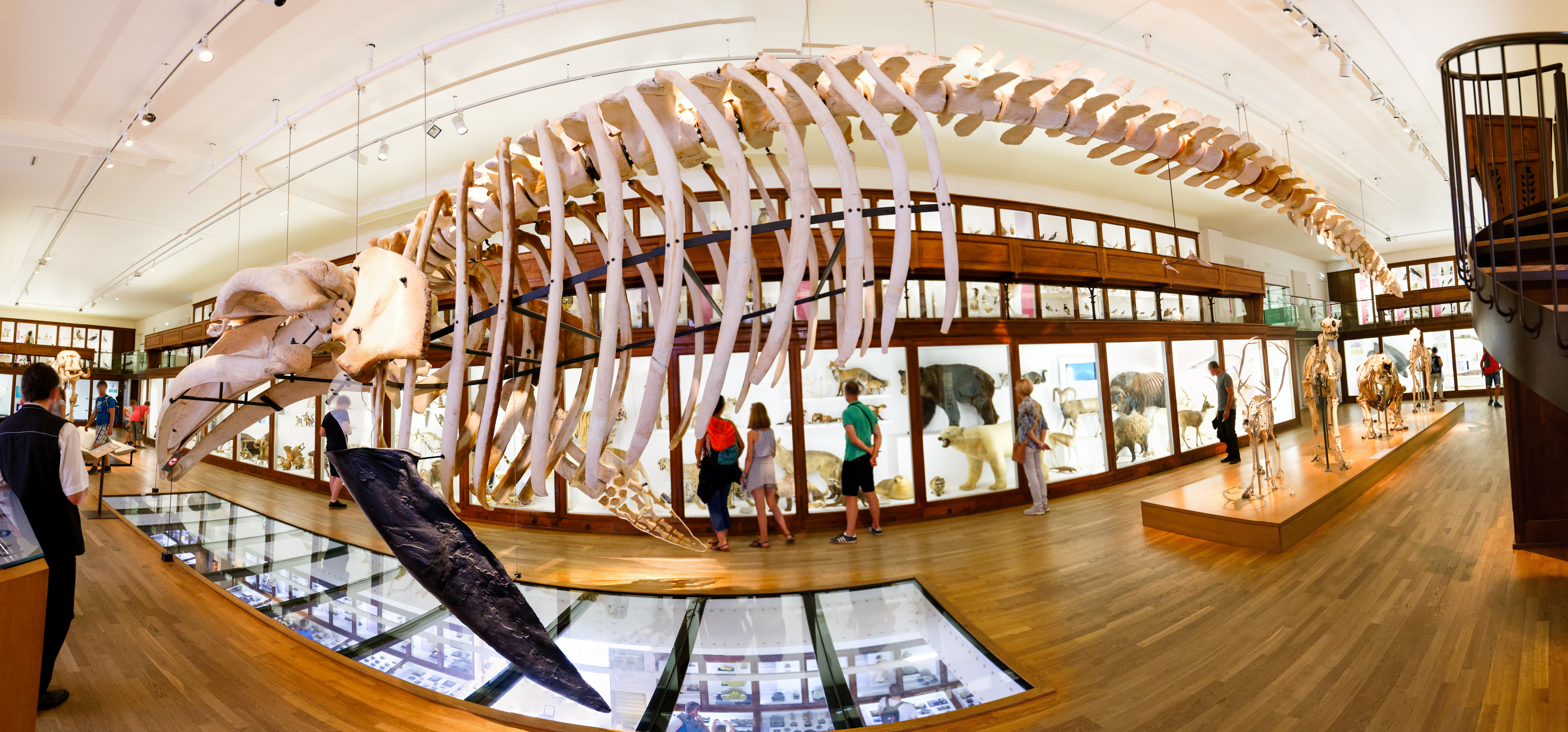
The great gallery

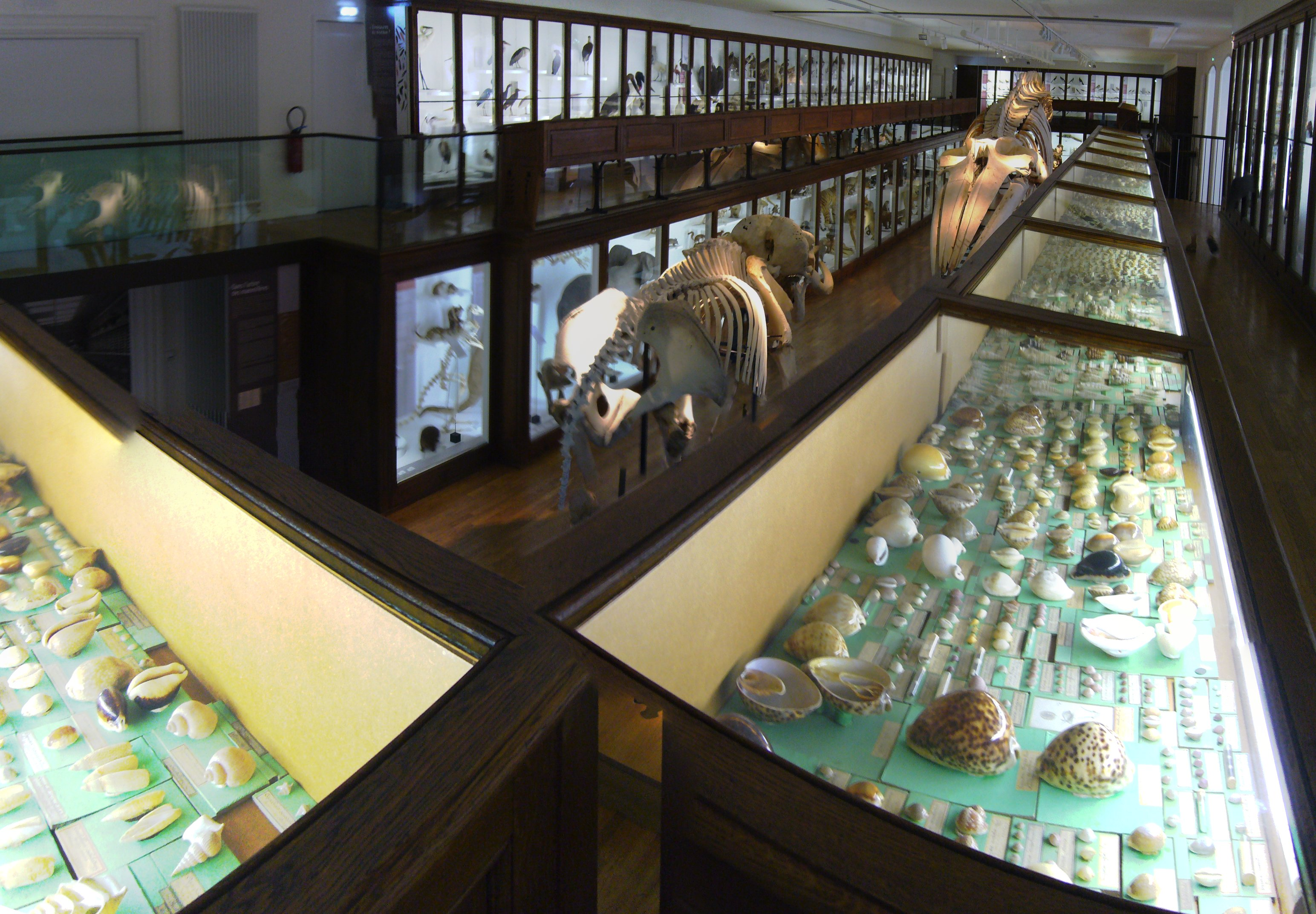
The great gallery

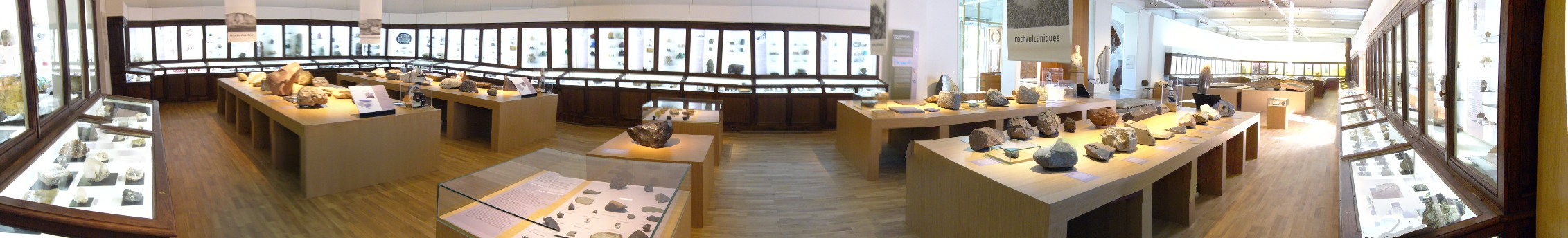
Mineralogy
