= South African Institute for Aquatic Biodiversity =

Centre for the study of aquatic biodiversity in Grahamstown, South Africa

Agency overview
- Formed: JLB Smith Institute of Ichthyology - 1966; 59 years ago; South African Institute of Aquatic Biodiversity - 1999; 26 years ago
- Headquarters: Somerset Street, Makhanda, South Africa; 33°18.593′S 26°31.152′E
- Parent department: Department of Science and Innovation
- Parent agency: National Research Foundation
- Website: https://saiab.ac.za

The South African Institute for Aquatic Biodiversity (SAIAB), is involved in research, education and in applications of its knowledge and research to African fish fauna, for either economic or conservation benefit.

The institute originally established in 1969, was formerly named the JLB Smith Institute of Ichthyology, in honour of Professor James Leonard Brierley Smith, who named and described the living coelacanth Latimeria chalumnae. The JLB Smith Institute of Ichthyology received recognition as a national research entity, renamed as the South African Institute of Aquatic Biodiversity in 1999.

Situated in Makhanda, Eastern Cape, the South African Institute for Aquatic Biodiversity (SAIAB) is an internationally recognised centre for the study of aquatic biodiversity.

As a National Facility of the NRF, SAIAB serves as a major scientific resource for knowledge and understanding the biodiversity and functioning of globally significant aquatic ecosystems. With both marine and freshwater biogeographical boundaries, southern Africa is ideally placed to monitor and document climate change.

From a marine perspective South Africa forms the southern apex of a major continental mass, flanked by very different marine ecosystems on the east and west coasts, and projecting towards the cold southern Ocean large marine ecosystem. SAIAB's scientific leadership and expertise in freshwater aquatic biodiversity is vital to the national interest when dealing with issues arising from exponentially increasing pressures of human population growth and development.

== Special Collections ==
SAIAB is home to the Margaret Smith Library, named in honour of the first Director of the JLB Smith Institute of Ichthyology

== Affiliations ==
- Rhodes University, Department of Ichthyology and Fisheries Science
