= Manado Tua =

Island in Indonesia

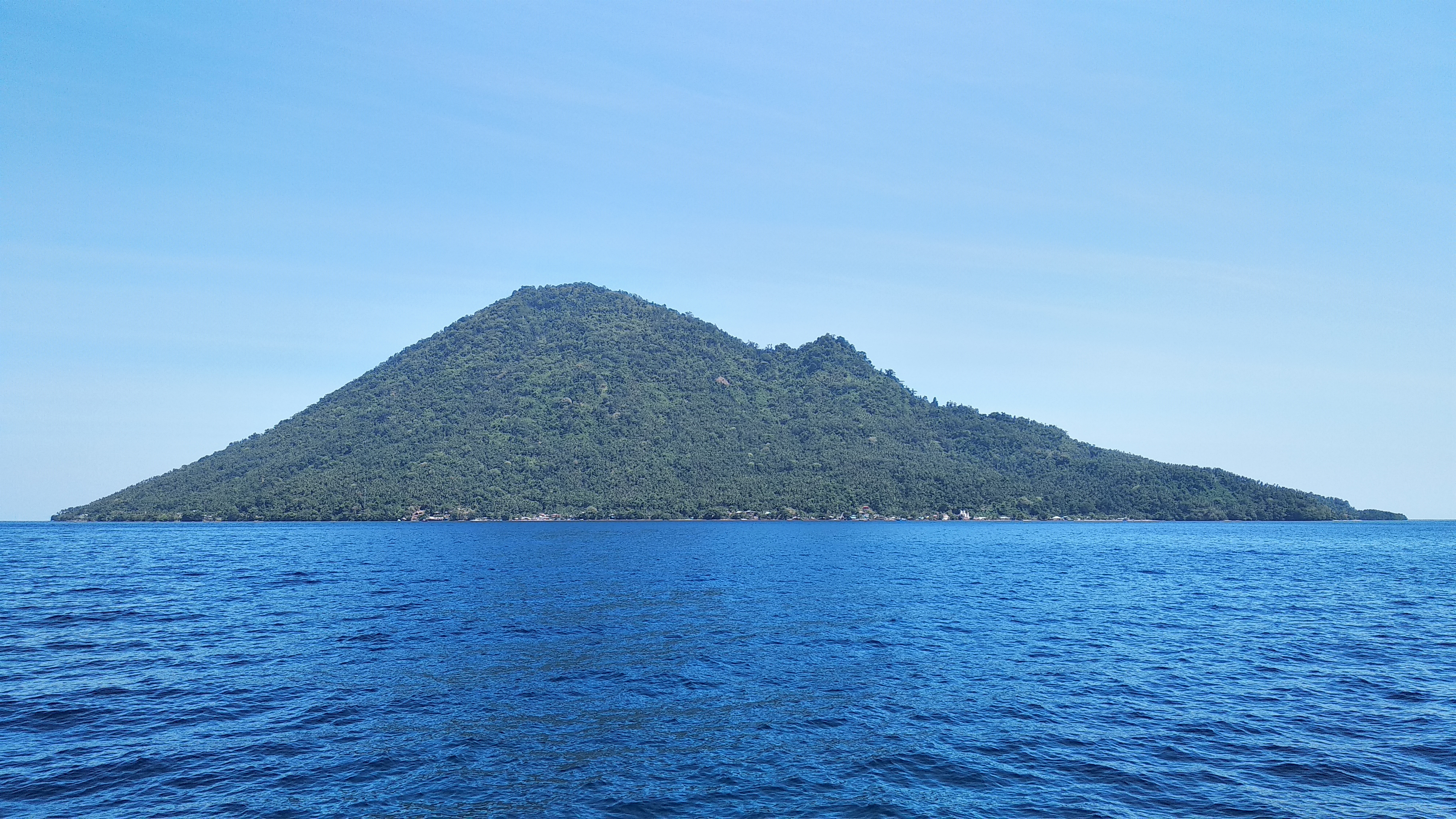

- Location within Indonesia

Geography
- Location: Indonesia
- Coordinates: 1°38′N 124°42′E
- Area: 10 km^{2} (3.9 sq mi)
- Highest elevation: 764 m (2507 ft)

Administration
- Indonesia

Demographics
- Ethnic groups: Minahasan and Sangirese

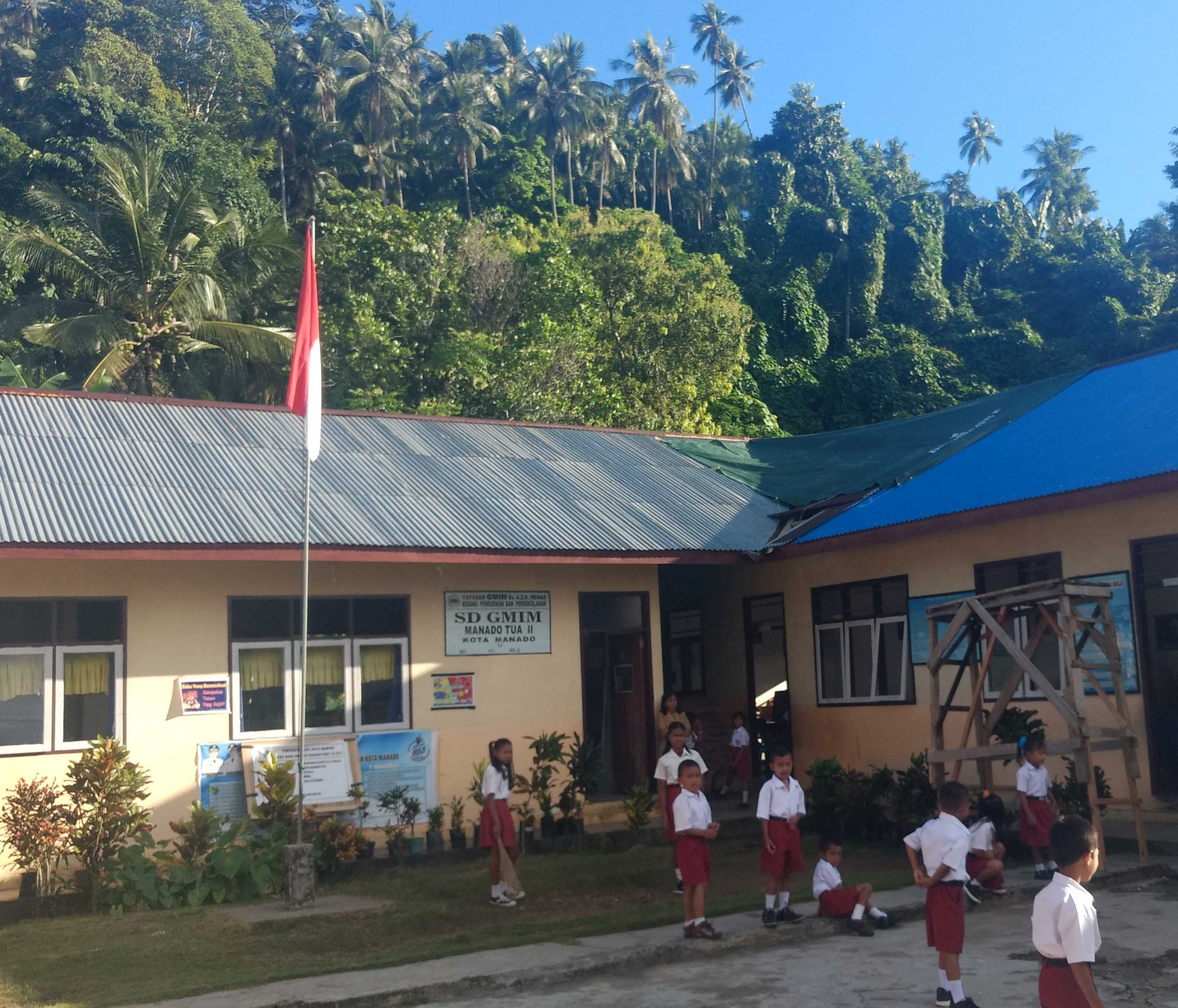
One of the school buildings located at Manado Tua

Manado Tua is a volcanic island in the Celebes Sea off the northeast coast of Sulawesi. The island is located in Bunaken National Park. It was once the capital of the Manado Kingdom, a 16th-century Christian kingdom with Portuguese and Spanish influences.

The name Manado comes from manadou or wanazou meaning 'on the far coast' or 'in the distance', which is derived from Minahasan languages. When the settlement on the island was relocated to Sulawesi, the name Manado was brought with it, and the island became referred to as Manado Tua ("Old Manado").
