= Cotterill =

Cotterill is a surname, and may refer to:

- Arthur Cotterill (1848–1902), New Zealand cricketer and lawyer, whose four brothers and three sons all played first-class cricket
- Colin Cotterill (born 1952), an Anglo-Australian teacher, writer and cartoonist
- David Cotterill (born 1987), a Welsh footballer
- George Edward Cotterill (1839–1913), an English cricketer who played for Sussex
- George Huth Cotterill (1868–1950), an England international footballer, son of George Edward Cotterill
- George F. Cotterill (1865–1958), a Seattle, Washington engineer (1890s) and politician (1910s)
- Henry Cotterill (1812–1886) Bishop of Edinburgh
- James Cotterill (born 1982), a retired English footballer
- Joseph Cotterill (1851–1933), an English cricketer who played for Sussex, brother of George Edward Cotterill
- Mark Cotterill (born 1960), the founder and former chairman of the England First Party
- Murray Cotterill (died 1995), a Canadian trade union activist
- Rodney Cotterill (1933–2007), an Anglo–Danish physicist and neuroscientist
- Steve Cotterill (born 1964), an English footballer and manager
- Thomas Cotterill (1779–1823), an English hymn-writer
