= Featherbed Nature Reserve =

Nature reserve in South Africa

- Interactive map of Featherbed Nature Reserve
- Location: Knysna, Western Cape Province, South Africa
- Nearest town: Knysna
- Coordinates: 34°04′33″S 23°03′20″E
- Opened: 1984
- Founder: William Smith
- Owner: Featherbed Co
- Website: http://www.knysnafeatherbed.com/

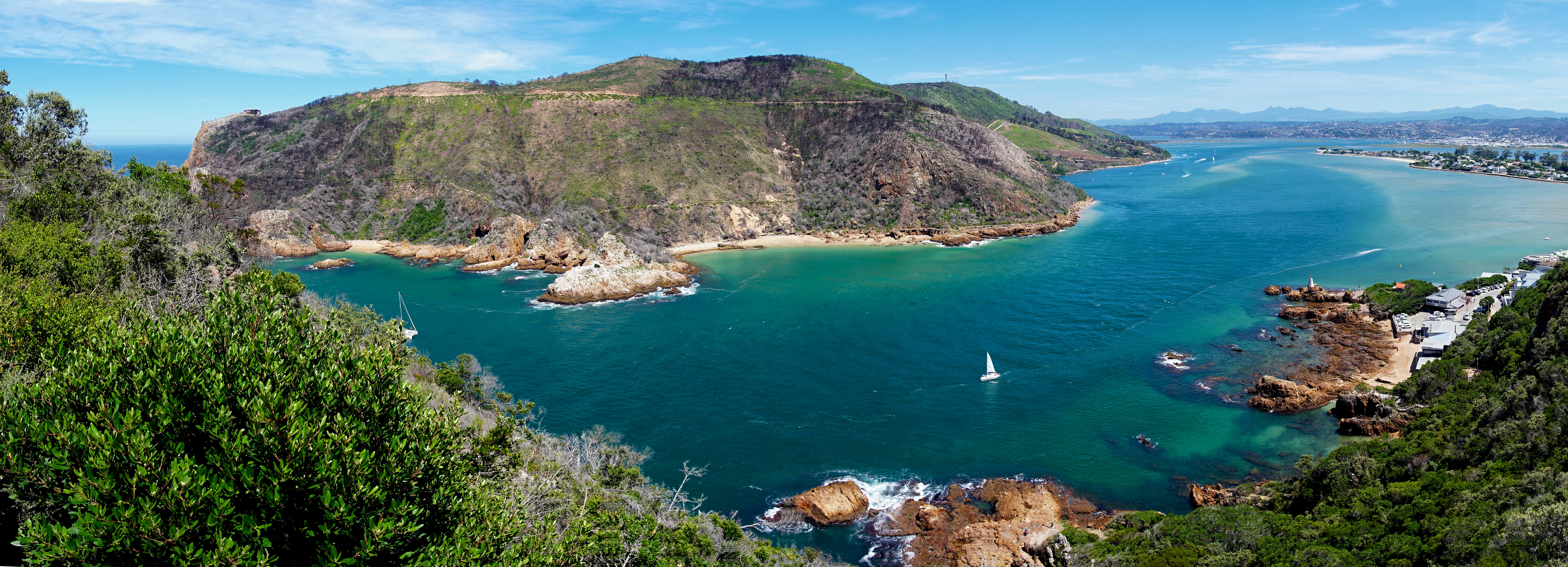
Knysna Western Head

Featherbed Nature Reserve is a privately owned nature reserve on the Western Headland of the Knysna River Estuary on South Africa’s Garden Route.

It was founded by South African television teacher, William Smith, on land that was bought in the 1950s by his father, the chemist and ichthyologist Professor JLB Smith, with the proceeds of his best selling book, ‘Old Fourlegs The Story of the Coelacanth,’ published in 1956.

The reserve opened to visitors in 1984, and is only accessible to the public by ferry. Smith sold the reserve to Eastern-Cape-based businessman Kobus Smit in 2008.

== Fauna & Flora ==
Featherbed Nature Reserve is situated within the Cape Floristic Region. Its vegetation is characterised by Knysna Sand Fynbos and coastal dune thicket. Large portions of the fynbos, and large stands of invasive alien vegetation (particularly rooikrans - Acacia cyclops), which once infested the Reserve, were decimated by fires in the 2017 Cape storm and Kynsna fires. Following the fires, the reserve management instituted a systematic eradication programme in an attempt to contain the resurgence of the rooikrans.

Fauna observed on the reserve includes Cape bushbuck, blue duiker, African clawless otter, and many smaller mammals. Birdlife includes the Knysna turaco (Knysna loerie) and African Black Oystercatcher.
