= Emma Krogh =

- Born: 25 October 1874; Pretoria
- Died: 29 February 1960 (aged 85); Warrenpoint
- Occupation: Actor
- Children: Stella Blakemore

Emmerentia Susanna Catharina Krogh (25 October 1874 – 29 February 1960) was the first identifiable film actress in South Africa.

Emma Krogh was born on 25 October 1874 in Pretoria, then part of the South African Republic. She was the daughter of Theunis Johannes Krogh, Under State Secretary for Home Affairs in the administration of President Paul Kruger.

She appeared on stage as Katie de Villiers in Vere Stent's play War and a Woman in 1909. She starred in the lost silent film The Great Kimberley Diamond Robbery (1911), thought to be the first fictional film from South Africa. She played the kidnapped heroine Kate Grangeway. She also ran a music school in Pretoria.

In 1902, she married British army captain Percy Blakemore. Their daughter, author Stella Blakemore, was born in 1906, but the next year he deserted his family to become a professional gambler.

Emma Krogh died on 29 February 1960 in Warrenpoint, Ireland where she lived with her daughter's family.
