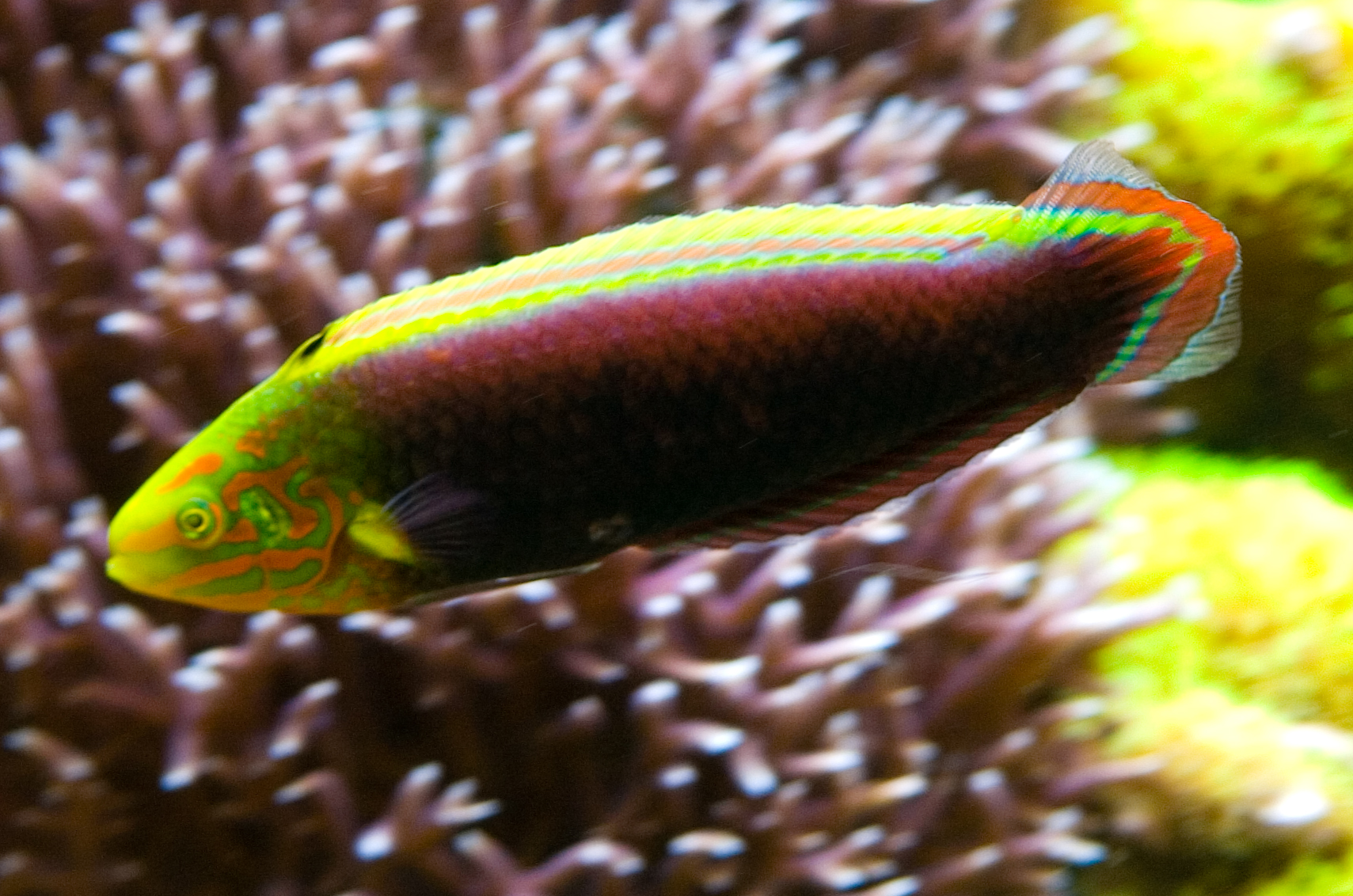

Conservation status
- Least Concern (IUCN 3.1)

Scientific classification
- Kingdom: Animalia
- Phylum: Chordata
- Class: Actinopterygii
- Order: Labriformes
- Family: Labridae
- Genus: Halichoeres
- Species: H. iridis

Binomial name
- Halichoeres iridis J. E. Randall & M. M. Smith, 1982

= Halichoeres iridis =

Species of fish

Halichoeres iridis is a species of wrasse native to the western Indian Ocean along the African coast and nearby islands. It can be found in areas of rubble and sand around reefs at depths from 6 to 43 m (20 to 141 ft). This species can reach 11.5 cm (4.5 in) in total length. It can be found in the aquarium trade.
