= John Rowley =

South African-born English cricketer and colonial governor

Personal information
- Full name: John Vincent D'Alessio Rowley
- Born: 12 September 1907; Graaff-Reinet, Cape Province, South Africa
- Died: 30 November 1996 (aged 89); Newbury, Berkshire, England
- Batting: Right-handed
- Role: Wicket-keeper

Domestic team information
- Years: Team
- 1949–1951: Devon
- 1927: Oxford University

Career statistics
Competition	First-class
Matches	2
Runs scored	4
Batting average	2.00
100s/50s	–/–
Top score	2*
Balls bowled	–
Wickets	–
Bowling average	–
5 wickets in innings	–
10 wickets in match	–
Best bowling	–
Catches/stumpings	1/1
- Source: Cricinfo, 8 March 2011

John Vincent D'Alessio Rowley (12 December 1907 – 30 November 1996) was a South African-born English cricketer and colonial governor. He was born in Graaff-Reinet, Cape Province, and went to school at St. Andrew's College, Grahamstown. He was later awarded a Rhodes Scholarship to study at Trinity College, Oxford.

Rowley was a right-handed batsman and wicket-keeper. He played two first-class matches for Oxford University in 1927, against the Army and the touring New Zealanders. In his two first-class matches he scored 4 runs at a batting average of 2.00, with a highest score of 2*. Behind the stumps he took a single catch and made a single stumping.

Rowley also played rugby for Oxford University in 1929.

Rowley made his debut for Devon in the 1949 Minor Counties Championship against Cornwall. He played two further fixtures for the county in 1949, against the Second XI's of Kent and Surrey. He played one further match for Devon in 1951 against Oxfordshire.

Rowley joined the Sudan Political Service in 1930 and served as Governor of Darfur 1953–1955. He then left the Sudan service and was General Manager of Bracknell New Town Development Corporation 1955–1973. He died in Newbury, Berkshire, on 30 November 1996.
