= Roger Barrow =

South African rowing coach

- Born: 2 December 1975 (age 49)
- Known for: Coach of SA rowing team

Roger Barrow was the coach for the South African national rowing team.

Barrow went to school at St. Andrew's College, Grahamstown.

== See also ==
- Jake Green (rower)
- James Thompson (rower)

== Notes and references ==
- Penney, Stephen (2 August 2012). "St Andrew's old boy wins Olympic gold". Grocott's Mail.
- Quarrell, Rachel (1 February 2016). "Coaching on the Knife-edge: South Africa's Roger Barrow". ROW 360.
- Tucker, Ross (2 September 2014). "Rowers up the creek without a paddle". Times LIVE.
- Alfred, Luke; Holme, Tristan (5 May 2016). "Rowing on the sniff of an oil rag". Financial Mail.
- "SA rowing coach in line for award". iol.co.za. 9 October 2014.
- Ndlovu, Mduduzi (7 June 2016). "SA rowing teams rearing to go in Rio". SABC News.
