= Jacko Maree =

South African businessman, banker and corporate executive

- Born: 10 August 1955 (age 71); Johannesburg, Union of South Africa
- Citizenship: South African citizenship
- Education: Oxford University; Master of Arts; University of Stellenbosch (Bachelor of Commerce)
- Occupations: Businessman, Banker & Corporate Executive
- Years active: since 1980

John (Jacko) Helenius Maree (born 30 August 1955, Johannesburg, South Africa) is a South African banker. He spent his career working for Standard Bank in South Africa both as its chief executive officer for fourteen years and as its deputy chairman since late 2016.

== Early life ==
Jacko Maree was born in Johannesburg South Africa on 30 August 1955 to parents John Maree, business executive and Joy du Plessis, a Springbok golfer. He matriculated from St. Andrew's College, Grahamstown in 1973 and attended Stellenbosch University where he obtained a Bachelor of Commerce. He later attended Oxford University after receiving a Rhodes Scholarship in 1978 where he obtained a Master of Arts degree in Politics, Philosophy and Economics in 1980. He also received a PMD from Harvard University.

== Career ==
He joined Standard Bank group in 1980. Maree started in the corporate finance department of Standard Merchant Bank (SMB). By 1991, Maree was promoted to managing director of SMB. And in 1995, promoted to managing director of the newly created Standard Corporate and Merchant Bank. In November 1999, Maree was appointed chief executive officer of the Standard Bank Group. Only newly appointment as CEO, Nedbank, one of the four main banks in South Africa, initially proposed a "friendly" merger in November which became more hostile when Standard Bank's board rejected it. Maree fought the merger eventually getting the government to decide whether there was any value in the merger reducing the size of banking competition in the country. Following a nine-month delay, in June 2000, South African Finance Minister Trevor Manuel announced his decision in parliament concerning the merger stating that it would not be allowed to proceed. In October 2009, he oversaw the sale of a twenty percent stake in Standard Bank to the Industrial and Commercial Bank of China (ICBC) for $5.5 billion. The same year he oversaw the bank's merger in 2009 of its Russian interests with a 33% stake in Russian investment bank called Troika Dialog.

Maree would retire as the CEO of Standard Bank Group in March 2013 and was replaced by Sim Tshabalala and Ben Kruger. He remained employed by the bank as a senior banker for client relationships until he officially retired in August 2015. During his years as the CEO of the bank, its shares had grown by 383%. In November 2016, the Standard Bank Group Ltd. appointed Maree as its deputy chairman of the group. In January 2015, he was appointed to Liberty Holdings Limited as its chairman.

In April 2018, President Cyril Ramaphosa appointed Maree as one of his four Special Envoys on Investment whose aim was to speak to and attracted investors to invest $100 billion at the presidents Investment Conference to be held later that year.

== Honours ==
Maree received a Lifetime Achiever Award on 12 November 2020 at the Sunday Times Top 100 Companies annual awards.

== Marriage ==
Maree married Sandra Margaret on 2 May 1981 and has two daughters.
