= Ernest Glanville =

Ernest Glanville (5 May 1855 in Wynberg – 6 September 1925 in Rondebosch) was a Cape Colony and later South African author, known especially for his short stories which are widely read and taught in South Africa. He also wrote seventeen historical novels.

Glanville was educated at St. Andrew's College, Grahamstown from January 1869 to May 1871. His schooling was interrupted when he and his father transported the first printing press from Grahamstown to Griqualand West by ox wagon in 1870 and began publishing a newspaper in Kimberley. In addition to his literary works, he worked in journalism for the Cape Argus and other newspapers, and collaborated with Dr MacGowan on the 1905 Jubilee Hymn. He was married to Emma Priscilla Powell, with whom he had four children—Thomas Burt, Ada Hoole, John, and Denis Gordon.

== Publications ==
- Among The Cape Kaffirs, 1888
- The Lost Heiress, 1891
- The Fossicker, 1892
- A Fair Colonist, 1894
- The Golden Rock, 1895
- Kloof Yarns, 1896
- Tales From The Veld, 1897
- The Kloof Bride, 1898
- The Inca's Treasure, 1899
- The Despatch Rider, 1900
- Max Thornton, 1901
- The Lost Regiment, 1901
- A Beautiful Rebel, 1902
- The Commandant, 1902
- The Diamond Seekers, 1903
- In Search of the Okapi. 1904.
- A Rough Reformer, 1905
- Tyopa, 1920
- Through the Red Revolt on the Rand, 1922
- Claw And Fang, 1923
- The Yellow-Maned Lion, 1925
- The Hunter, 1926
