= Stella Blakemore =

South African writer (1906–1991)

Personal details
- Born: April 13, 1906 Lindley, Orange Free State, South Africa
- Died: May 1991 Rostrevor, Newry and Mourne, Northern Ireland, UK
- Spouse: David Owen
- Children: 2
- Education: Royal Academy of Music
- Known for: South African Youth Fiction Writer
- Nom de plume is Theunis Krogh

Stella Blakemore (1906–1991) was a South African woman writer of Afrikaans youth novels.

== Roots ==
Blakemore was born in a tent near Lindley in the Orange River Colony on 13 April 1906. She went to school in Natal. Her mother, Emmarentia Susanna Catherina Krogh was a music teacher of Boer descent and her father was Captain Percy Harold Jenks Blakemore, an officer in the British Army. However, Blakemore left his wife and child four years later to become a professional card player. Her most famous pseudonym, Theunis Krogh, was derived from her grandfather on her mother's side - Theunis Johannes Krogh, the undersecretary of the South African Republic administration of President Paul Kruger. In 1933 she married the Welshman David Owen, a civil engineer, in London, which was the start of a period of worldwide travel for her. The lived, amongst other places, in Ghana, The Ivory Coast, Italy, England, Swaziland, Nigeria, Germany and Ireland. The couple had two children, Peter and Salene, both of whom were adopted. She died in Rostrevor, Newry and Mourne, Northern Ireland, UK, aged 85 In May 1991.

== Education ==
After completing high school she studied piano and singing at the Royal Academy of Music in London, as well as opera in Germany. Afterwards she returned to South Africa where she taught for a time in Johannesburg and Pretoria.

== Writing ==
- She began writing in the 1920s in Germany; her first work was a play, Die Goue Sleutel ("The Golden Key").
- Die Meisies van Maasdorp ("The Girls of Maasdorp") - the first book in her Maasdorp series - was published in 1932. Fifteen other books in this series followed.
- Blakemore also wrote the twenty-book Keurboslaan series (under the male pseudonym Theunis Krogh).The first book was "die Hoof van Keurboslaan"
- She also wrote books under the names Analize Biermann, Stella Owen and Diem Grimbeeck.
- 66 books were published
