= Mary Roe Knowling =

South African doctor

Mary Roe Knowling (21 October 1923 – 31 January 2013) was a South African medical doctor.

She was born in Grahamstown to Arthur Knowling and Ruth Mullins. She attended the Diocesan School for Girls from 1933 to 1941. She served during World War II as a bombardier in the coastal artillery on Robben Island, after which she trained as a nurse at Groote Schuur Hospital in Cape Town. After a stint as a midwife in East London and overseas travel she returned to South Africa to study medicine at University of Cape Town.

She returned to her home city of Grahamstown and established a successful medical practice from 1965 to 1987. In addition to her medical work she was also a churchwarden at the Grahamstown Cathedral and spent a great deal of time and effort on the restoration of the cathedral, she was awarded membership of the Order of Simon of Cyrene in 2011 in recognition for this and other philanthropic work in Grahamstown. The Sunset Rotary Club of Grahamstown named Dr Knowling its third "Citizen of the Year" in 2001.

Her philanthropic work included voluntary work for:

- Diocesan School for Girls
- Grahamstown and District Relief Association (Gadra)
- Eloxweni Children's Shelter and the
- SPCA

== Publications ==
She co-authored The Diary of Robert John Mullins (1833–1913) and The Lives of Robert and Jennie Mullins
