= Arthur Matthews (mathematician) =

Professor Arthur Matthews
- Born: 7 April 1848; Torquay, England
- Died: 1911; Cape Province

Arthur Matthews (1848 – 1911) was a founding professor at Rhodes University in Grahamstown, South Africa.

== Early life ==
Matthews was born in Torquay, England in 1848 to John Redaway and Agnes Mudge Matthews. He studied at Sidney Sussex College, Cambridge where he obtained the degrees Bachelor of Arts (BA) in 1870 and Master of Arts (MA) in 1873. He later obtained a Bachelor of Science (BSc) degree from the University of London.

== Cape Colony ==
He came to the Cape Colony in 1875 as the first lecturer in mathematics and physical science at St. Andrew's College, Grahamstown, and later became professor and vice-principal of its College Department. He built up at a Land Survey Department while at St. Andrew's College and trained many of South Africa's early land surveyors, including four Surveyors General.

In 1904 Rhodes University College was established and its first four professors appointed from the staff of St. Andrew's College. One of these was Matthews, who became professor of mathematics and chairman of the university senate.

Matthews retired from Rhodes University in 1910 and died in the Cape Province in 1911.

== Works ==
- Register of S. Andrew's College, Grahamstown: From 1855 to 1902. J.C. Juta & Co. 1902.
- Notes on chemico-physics and the chemistry of the non-metals. Grahamstown. 1886.
