= Frank Douglass =

South African rugby union player

- Born: Francis Wingfield Douglass; 15 July 1875 Grahamstown, Cape Colony
- Died: 20 September 1972 (aged 97)
- School: St. Andrew's College

Rugby union career
- Position: Forward
Provincial / State sides
| Years | Team | Apps | (Points) |
- Eastern Province
- Correct as of 19 July 2010
International career
| Years | Team | Apps | (Points) |
| 1896 | South Africa | 1 | (0) |
- Correct as of 19 July 2010

Francis Wingfield Douglass (15 July 1875 – 20 September 1928) was a South African international rugby union player. Born in Grahamstown, he attended St. Andrew's College before playing provincial rugby for Eastern Province. He made his only Test appearance for South Africa during Great Britain's 1896 tour. He played as a forward in the 1st Test of the series, an 8–0 South Africa loss. Douglass died on 25 September 1928 at Mengo Hospital, Kampala, Uganda at the age of 53.
