= Percy W.H. Kettlewell =

Percy W.H. Kettlewell (1869 - 1950) was an English priest and educationist in the early 20th century.

Kettlewell matriculated in 1888 and graduated from Keble College, Oxford University in 1890. He was ordained as a priest in 1896. In 1909 he was appointed as the headmaster of St. Andrew's College, Grahamstown. He held this office for 24 years.

Following his retirement from the college, he became vicar of Buckland, Buckinghamshire, in England (1934–44). In 1945 he was appointed canon emeritus of the Grahamstown Cathedral.

He was active as an archaeological collector at Kasouga and at Sugar-Loaf Hill, Grahamstown. He organised a transfer of archaeological material from the Albany Museum to the British Museum in 1922.

On 29 June 1914 he married Nina Mary Denison-Clarke at Grahamstown.

== Works ==
Kettlewell's published works include:

- Kettlewell, P. W. H. (1901). The Books of Ezra and Nehemiah. With Introduction, Notes, Maps and Appendices.

== Notes and references ==
- University of Oxford (1889). Oxford University Gazette. The Authority.
- University of Oxford (1894). Oxford Honours, 1220-1894: Being an Alphabetical Register of Distinctions Conferred by the University of Oxford from the Earliest Times. Clarendon Press. p. 143.
- Hawthorne, Peter; Bristow, Barry (1993). Historic schools of South Africa: an ethos of excellence. Pachyderm Press. ISBN 978-0-9583247-5-5.
- Currey, Ronald Fairbridge (1955). St. Andrew's College, Grahamstown, 1855-1955. Blackwell.
- Meshel, Naphtali S. (2014). The 'Grammar' of Sacrifice: A Generativist Study of the Israelite Sacrificial System in the Priestly Writings with a 'Grammar' of Σ. Oxford University Press. ISBN 978-0-19-870556-7.
- Cohen, Alan. Appendix 4. Individual Collectors Represented in The British Museum Southern African Stone Age Collections (PDF).
