= Diocesan School for Girls, Grahamstown =

Coordinates: 33°18′32″S 26°30′56″E

Diocesan School for Girls

Location
- 16 Worcester Street; Makhanda; Eastern Cape 6140; South Africa

Information
- School type: Private & Boarding
- Motto: En Avant
- Religious affiliation: Christianity
- Established: 1874; 152 years ago
- Locale: Urban
- Sister school: St. Andrew's College, Grahamstown
- Headmaster: Jannie de Villiers
- Exam board: IEB
- Staff: 100 full-time
- Grades: 4–12
- Gender: Female
- Age: 10 to 18
- Enrollment: 520 girls
- Language: English
- Schedule: 07:45 - 14:50
- Colours: Green; White
- 2016 Fees: R 115 440.00 to R 187 260.00 p.a.(boarding); R 51 210.00 to R 93 800.00 p.a. (tuition)
- Website: www.dsgschool.com

The Diocesan School for Girls or DSG is a private boarding school for girls, situated in Makhanda (Grahamstown) in the Eastern Cape province of South Africa. It is one of the most expensive private girls' schools in South Africa.

== Associated schools ==
DSG shares close ties with other schools in Grahamstown: St. Andrew's College, a high school for boys and St. Andrew's Preparatory School, a co-educational primary school. Most girls enter the school in grade 4, coming from St. Andrew's Preparatory School. There are about 120 girls from grade 4 to grade 7 (the primary school phase) and 400 from grade 8 to grade 12 (the high school phase.) From grade 10 all the academic classes are shared with St. Andrew's College and are thus co-instructional. The DR Wynne Music School, and a design and technology centre are shared with St. Andrew's College.

== Notable alumnae ==
- Mary Rae Knowling, medical doctor, Anglican and philanthropist who boarding house, "Knowling" is named after
- Cecily Norden, author, senior horse judge, champion rider and exhibitor and stud breeder
- Josie Wood, educator, co-founder of the South African Library for the Blind and the South African National Council for the Blind
