= Andrew de Blocq =

South African ornithologist and politician

Andrew de Blocq MP

Member of the National Assembly of South Africa
- Incumbent
- Assumed office 14 June 2024
- Constituency: Gauteng

Personal details
- Born: 22 January 1992 (age 34) Alkmaar, Netherlands
- Party: Democratic Alliance
- Education: St. Andrew's College
- Alma mater: University of Cape Town (BSc, BScHons, MSc)
- Profession: Politician, ornithologist
- Committees: Portfolio Committee for Forestry, Fisheries, and the Environment
- Website: www.andrewdeblocq.com

Andrew Dirk de Blocq van Scheltinga (born 22 January 1992), known as Andrew de Blocq, is a South African ornithologist and politician who has been a Member of the National Assembly of South Africa since 2024, representing the Democratic Alliance.

== Early life and education ==
De Blocq was born in Alkmaar, Netherlands on 22 January 1992. He attended Rondebosch Boys' Preparatory School in Rondebosch for his primary education. He spent his high school years boarding at St. Andrews College in Grahamstown in the Eastern Cape. After high school, he spent a gap year in Edinburgh, Scotland. De Blocq returned to Cape Town thereafter and began studying at the University of Cape Town from which he graduated with a Bachelor of Science in Ecology and Evolutionary biology and Applied Biology in 2013, a honours degree in Biological Sciences in 2014, and then a Master of Science in Biological Sciences in 2017. He conducted his honours degree thesis on the spotted hyena and his master's degree thesis which focused on the effects of boat-based tourism on waterbirds was conducted through the FitzPatrick Institute of African Ornithology.

== Career ==
De Blocq worked as a research project manager at the University of Cape Town between October 2015 and March 2016 and also as a freelance professional bird guide from October 2015 until December 2017. He joined BirdLife South Africa in 2018, working as a coastal seabird conservation manager before becoming an Avitourism Project Manager in 2020.

== Political career ==
De Blocq was a participant of the Democratic Alliance's Young Leaders Programme in 2023. He stood as a parliamentary candidate for the party from Gauteng in the 2024 general election and was elected to the National Assembly of South Africa. De Blocq was elected as the top candidate from the province on the regional ballot. Since becoming an MP, he has been a member of the Portfolio Committee on Forestry, Fisheries and the Environment and has been appointed as party spokesperson for the portfolio.
