= William Bleloch =

William Bleloch (9 February 1906 in Johannesburg – 20 June 1991) was a South African metallurgist noted for developing smelting techniques for the processing of chrome ores. At a 1975 ceremony when the University of the Witwatersrand conferred upon him an honorary doctorate of Science and Engineering, the citation read "William Bleloch can truly be called the father of our electrochemical and electrometallurgical industries".

== Education ==
Bleloch was the son of the geologist, William Edwin Bleloch. Bleloch matriculated at St. Andrew's College, Grahamstown and enrolled at the University of the Witwatersrand where he was awarded a B.Sc. degree with first-class honours in 1927, and an M.Sc. degree in 1928. From there he studied at the University of London, and obtained a Ph.D. in chemical engineering, with first-class honours in chemistry, in 1930. While in London he met a young American, Jean Denny, whom he subsequently married. Three sons and two daughters resulted from the marriage.

== World War II ==
Bleloch's first post back in South Africa was as Chief Chemist to the Union Steel Corporation. He enlisted in the South African Engineering Corps at the outbreak of World War II, and was commissioned to compile a feasibility report on establishing a mustard gas plant on the farm Klipfontein near Kempton Park as part of the war effort. The production rate of 10 tons per day was not regarded as sufficient by the British principals and a second factory was established at Firgrove near Somerset West. Once full production had been reached the project was placed under civilian management. Bleloch described the manufacture of gas as 'a foul and thankless task and very hazardous', and remarkably no fatalities occurred during production. Mustard gas was used in various campaigns during World War II. (see Mustard gas#Use)

By the end of the war, Lieutenant-Colonel Bleloch's responsibilities included converting the Klipfontein installation to produce DDT, a conversion which was convenient as it made use of benzene and chlorine, both of which were on hand as surplus stock from the mustard gas days. DDT was used to combat louse-borne typhus fever which at that time had reached epidemic proportions in parts of Southern Africa. His 1947 paper on the conversion delivered to the Chemical, Metallurgical and Mining Society of South Africa, earned him the Society's Gold Medal. A subsequent paper was presented to the South African Institute of Engineers and dealt with the production of ethylene, making him a pioneer in the large-scale production of synthetic organic chemicals.

== Further Work ==
In 1934 Bleloch had outlined a method for the extraction of vanadium and pig iron from vanadiferous magnetite. In the years after WWII he once again became involved in metallurgical and electro-metallurgical projects. In 1948 he took 100 tons of Bushveld Igneous Complex magnetite to Norway where vanadium was extracted, and pig iron was converted to steel. His visionary concept was set out in a March 1949 paper entitled "The electric smelting of iron ores for production of alloy irons and steels and the recovery of chromium and vanadium" which was published by the South African Institute of Mining and Metallurgy. During this period he was Technical Adviser to Rand Mines Limited on a project to construct a commercial plant to produce chromium steel from Bushveld ore. The Evraz Highveld Steel & Vanadium (EHSV) process flowsheet was developed in the early 1960s, based on Bleloch's 1949 work. He showed that magnetite ore from the Bushveld Igneous Complex could be smelted using a submerged-arc furnace while controlling carbon addition.

His 1950 paper to the South African Institute of Engineers entitled "Theoretical considerations in the operation of iron blast furnaces with cold oxygen carbon dioxide blast" earned him another Gold Medal. It would take some 30 years for Bleloch's ideas to be realised.

The improvement of blast-furnace technology continued to hold his interest, and in 1971 he published "Theory of cold blast iron production with stackgas of low nitrogen content". The ideas in this paper were regarded as a realistic solution to the nagging problem of a shortage of local reserves of coking coal, and outlined ideas for producing ferro-alloys of lower melting points. Bleloch was elected a President of The South African Institute of Mining and Metallurgy for the year 1956-1957. His inaugural address, "Metals and megawatts in South-eastern Africa", was hailed for its lucid exposition of the prospects for the electrometallurgical industries of the region.
