= St. Andrew's College, Grahamstown =

College in South Africa

St Andrew's College
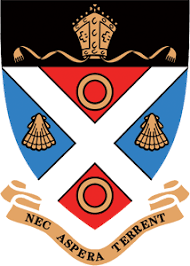
- St Andrew's College school crest

Location
- 1 Somerset Street; Makana Local Municipality, Sarah Baartman District; Makhanda, Eastern Cape, Eastern Cape; South Africa; 33°18′30″S 26°31′07″E

Information
- School type: All-boys private boarding school
- Motto: Latin: Nec Aspera Terrent (Difficulties do not dismay us)
- Religious affiliation: Christian
- Denomination: Anglican
- Patron saint: St. Andrew
- Established: 15 August 1855; 170 years ago
- Founder: John Armstrong, Bishop of Grahamstown
- Sister school: Diocesan School for Girls
- Chairman: Jaco Maree
- Head of school: Thomas Clucas (2024) Sinjhun Cawse (2023) Nicolas Lane (2022)
- Headmaster: Mr Tom Hamilton
- Exam board: IEB and A-level
- Chaplain: Rev Richard Wyngaard
- Grades: 8–12
- Boys: Male
- Age: 13 to 18
- Enrollment: 450 boys
- Capacity: 500
- Language: English
- Schedule: 07:45 - 14:50
- Campus size: 3.1 km^{2} (1.2 sq mi)
- Campus type: Open Campus
- Houses: Armstrong; Espin; Graham; Merriman; Mullins; Upper
- Colours: Blue, navy, white
- Song: Jesus Calls Us, O'er the Tumult
- Nickname: College
- Team name: Three Stripes
- Rivals: Dale College; Graeme College; Grey High School; Kingswood College; Queens College; Selborne College
- National ranking: 3
- Publication: The Andrean
- Yearbook: The Andrean
- Alumni: Old Andreans
- School fees: R 340 064 p.a. (boarding); R 143 064 p.a. (day scholars)
- Website: www.sacschool.com

St. Andrew's College is an Anglican high school for boys located in Makhanda (Grahamstown), Eastern Cape province of South Africa. It was founded in 1855 by the Right Reverend John Armstrong, the first Bishop of Grahamstown. It is a majority boarding school, with a number of day boys. St. Andrew's College caters to 480 pupils from around the globe. The school is also a member of the G30 Schools group and closely associated with its brother school, St. Andrew's Preparatory School, and its sister school the Diocesan School for Girls.

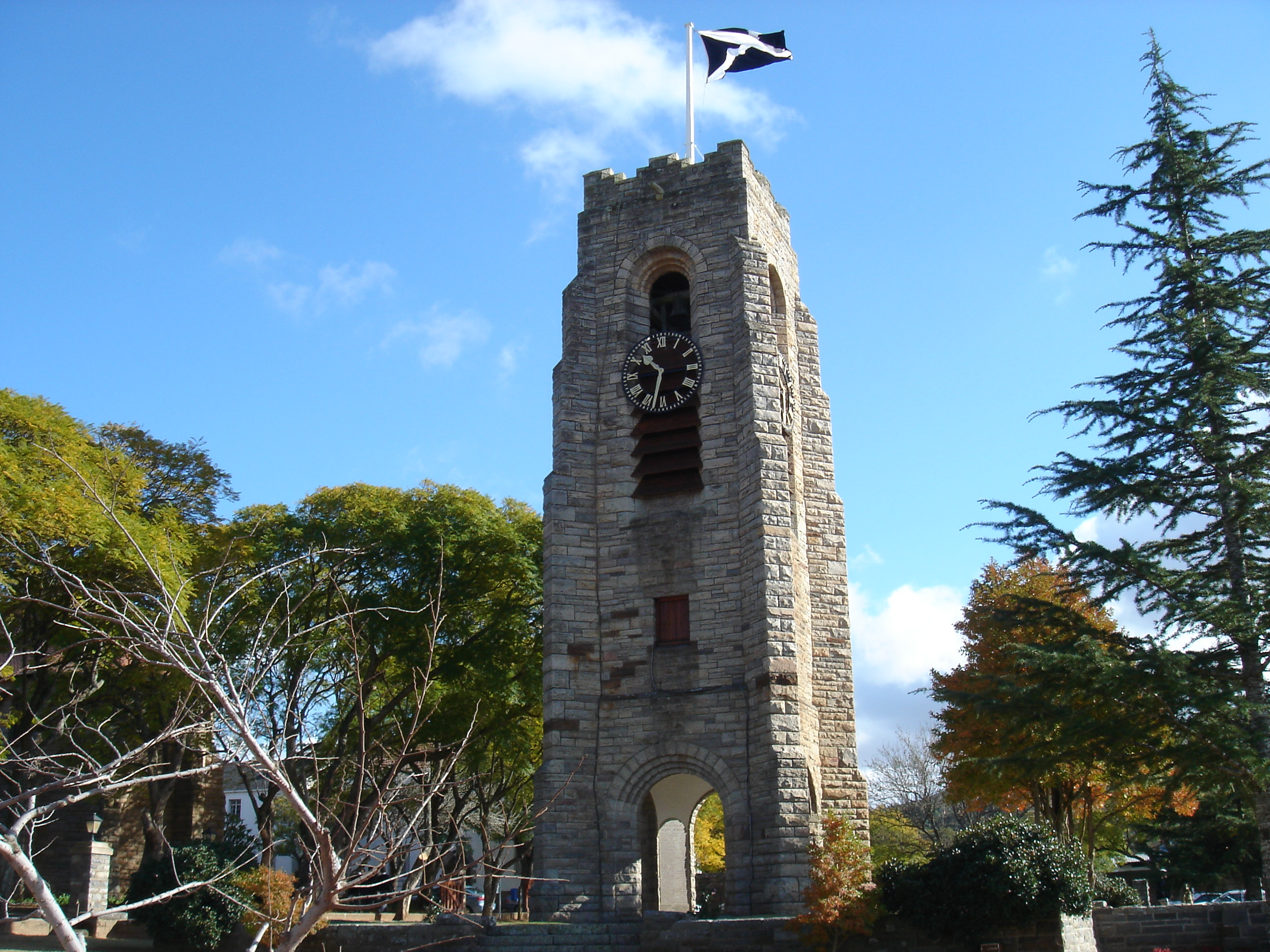
St. Andrew's College clock tower, built in 1923

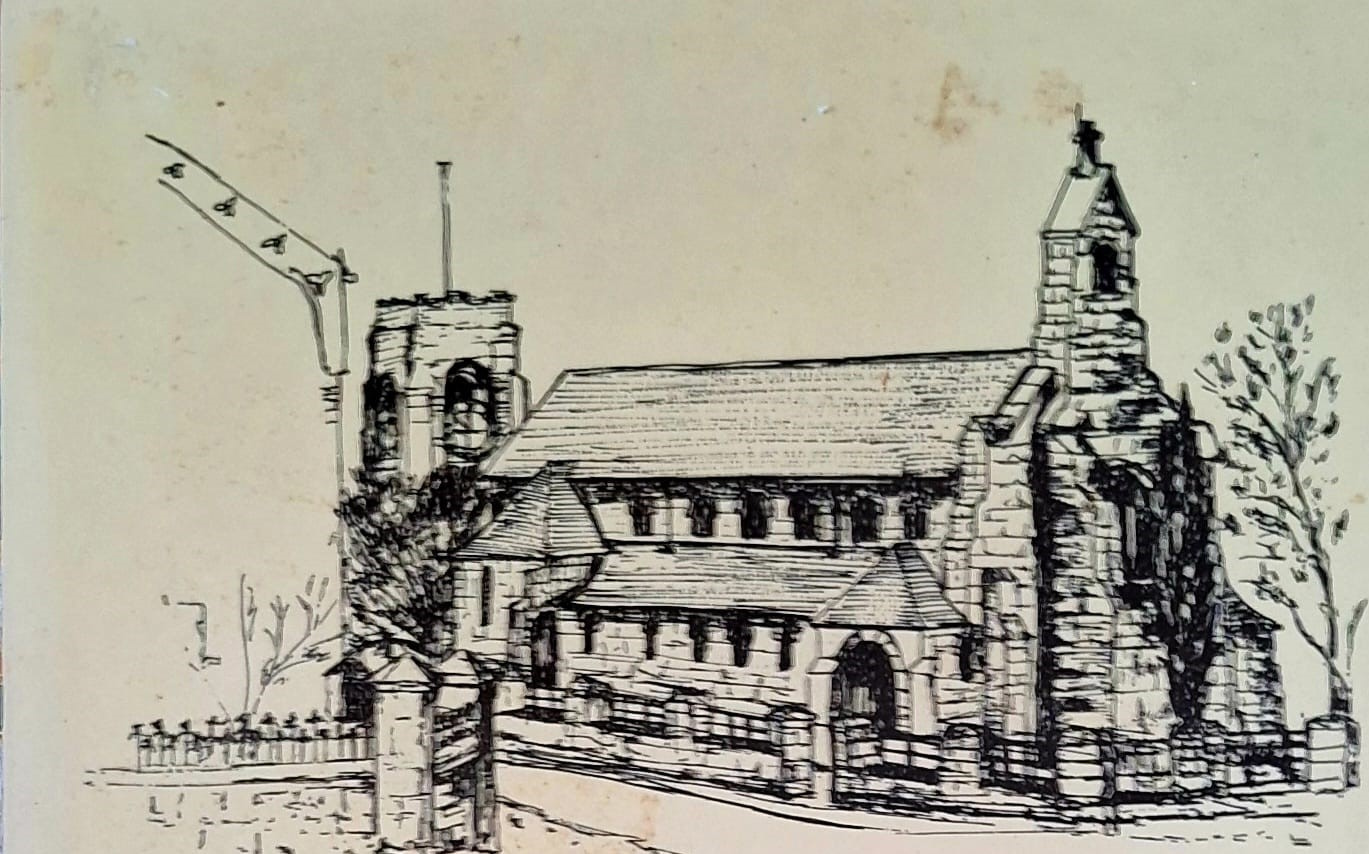
St. Andrew's Chapel Pen and ink drawing on a hard board by Amitabh Mitra

== History ==
In a letter dated August, 1855, Bishop Armstrong writes:

The last event I have to record was the laying of the foundation stone of our infant college, which I dedicated to St. Andrew, as on St. Andrew's Day I received consecration. It was a bright day in our annals. The clergy in their surplices, with Archdeacon Merriman at their head, moved in procession with a large body of lay people to the site of the chapel, where the Lieutenant-Governor and his Staff were waiting.

— Bishop John Armstrong

The laying of the foundation stone took place on 15 August 1855. Prior to this there existed a grammar school, founded by Bishop Robert Gray in 1849 on the site currently occupied by the Good Shepherd School, under the management of Mr. M.C. Bendelack, who was soon succeeded by the Rev. F. Bankes. Bankes was appointed principal of the new college, retaining also the title of Head-Master of St. Andrew's College Grammar School, as his school and all funds belonging to it were merged into the new institution. The Society for Promoting Christian Knowledge gave £1000 towards the building to which they added £500 in 1857, and a like sum in 1860. A supplementary sum was subscribed by friends of the Bishop.

St Andrew's College was incorporated by an Act of the Cape Parliament in September 1887, this Act was amended in 1932 and 1985. It has since been controlled by a council composed of communicant members of the Anglican Church, administering the school in terms of a trust deed, leaving its internal economy and discipline in the hands of the principal, who in terms of the 1887 Act was required to be a cleric. The Bishop of Grahamstown is ex officio Visitor to the college.

== Campus ==
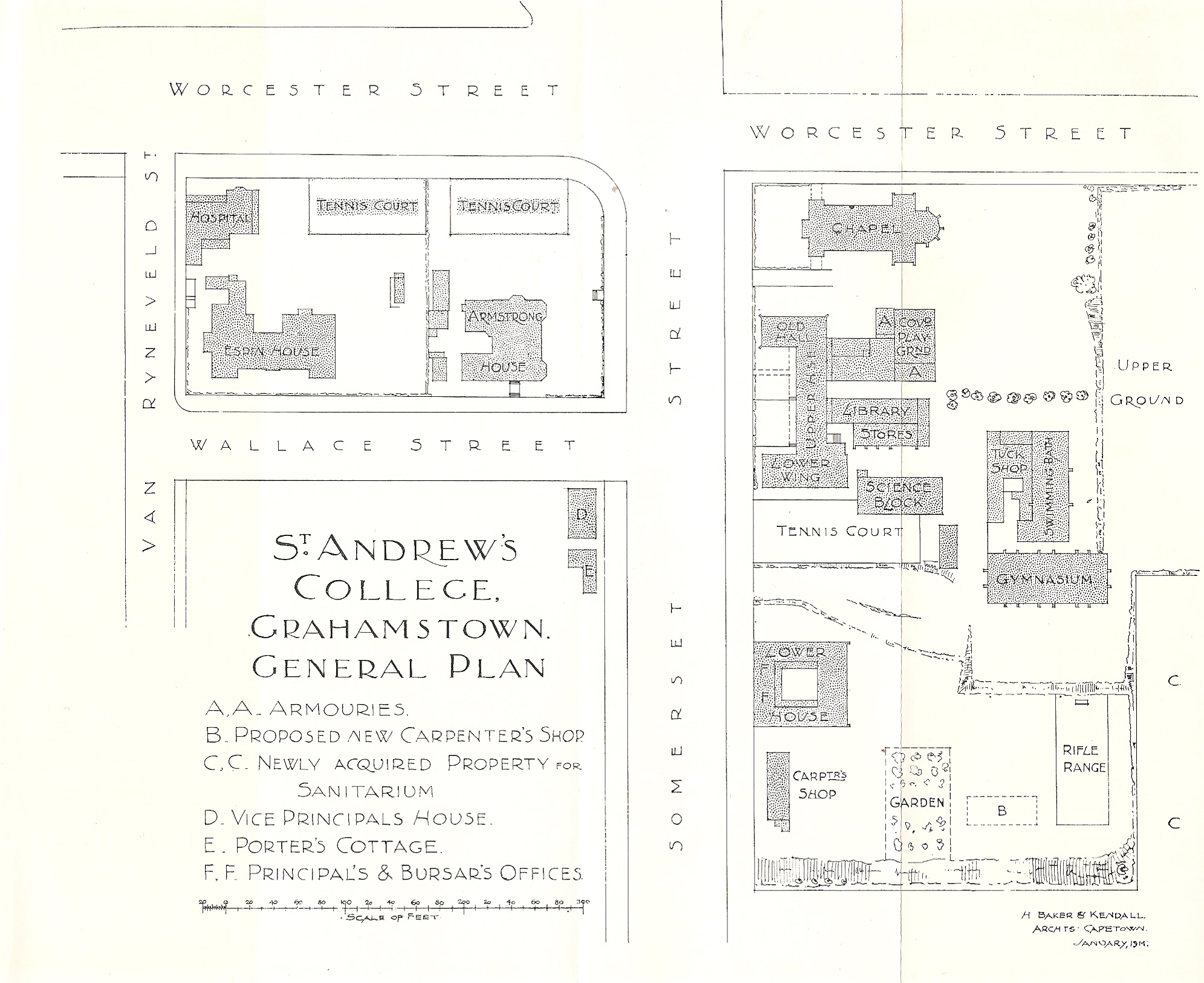
A general plan showing the layout of the school building and fields as drawn by the architectural practice of Sir Herbert Baker

The school campus straddles the main road from Cradock, Eastern Cape into Grahamstown and is an open campus with buildings, sports fields and other facilities spread over a number of city blocks. The St Andrews Clock tower, found at the centre of the school, was designed as a memorial to those Old Andreans who had died in the first world war. The foundation stone was laid in 1921 and the tower was dedicated on St Andrew's Day in 1923.

=== Chapel ===
The chapel, dedicated to St. Andrew and designed by Sir Herbert Baker, is at the heart of the school.

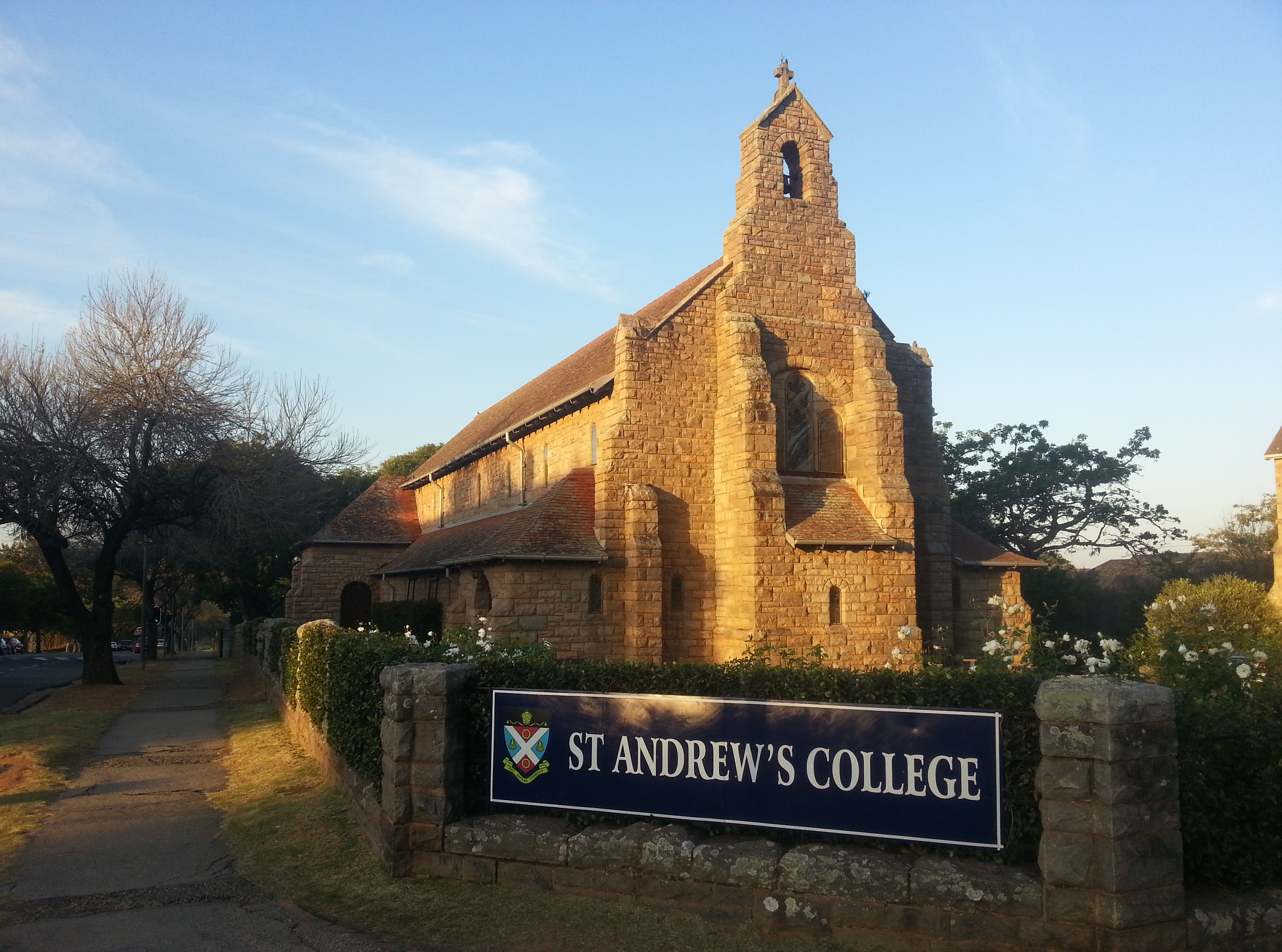
Chapel, St Andrew's College, Somerset Street, Grahamstown

The foundation stone of the new chapel was laid by the Rt Revd Charles Cornish, bishop of Grahamstown on St. Andrew's Day, 1905, the jubilee year of the college. But chiefly owing to lack of funds the stone remained built into a buttress at the back of Espin Cottage, and no start was made until 1913 when the building was begun on plans by Messrs. Herbert Baker & Kendall of Cape Town. A corner stone, to commemorate the building, was laid by the Hon. Sir Lewis Mitchell, C.V.O. on 8 September that year.

The design for the new chapel is in the early Gothic manner, but in order to suit the comparatively sunny climate of the Eastern Cape, there is just that suggestion of Italian treatment which prevents it from being a direct copy of an English type. The form is that of a central nave of six bays, spanned by an open timber roof with massive beams, king posts and struts, the prototypes of which form such an attractive feature in: so many old English churches. There are two narrow side aisles to serve as passages, each having space for one row of additional seats in case of emergency. The chancel has an apsidal east end, and is to be covered by a groined roof constructed in concrete, the sanctuary windows being kept high in such a way as to cut into the semi-circular line of the vault in an effective manner. Instead of transepts, the plan provides a projecting vestry on the north side so as to preserve the cruciform plan, while the side aisles at the west are terminated against small projecting porches.

At the west end the-baptistry is placed projecting westward of the wall and forming a semi-circular recess, which is to be covered with a grained ceiling. Springing from the projecting baptistry are buttresses which are carried up with diminishing outline and form a picturesque bell cote to terminate the west end of the roof. As far as possible local material was used. The walls throughout were built in Grahamstown stone with a rough face, both inside and out. This stone demands a simple treatment for the dressings-so that most of the windows are plain-but those around the apse include some effective tracery.

The roof is covered with tiles made in the province on the Broseley pattern, and laid to a steep pitch. The aisles are paved with red tiles, while the floor of the chancel is paved in somewhat the same manner, and the floor under the seats is, of course be boarded in the ordinary way.

The nave is about 70 feet (21 m) × 20 feet (6.1 m) irrespective of the side aisles; the chancel and sanctuary 37 feet (11 m) × 20 feet (6.1 m); from the floor of nave to ridge of roof about 35 feet (11 m) The total accommodation is for 330, of which number about 30 may be seated in the choir. Contrary to the custom of college chapels, the seats are all arranged facing the east instead of being placed down the two sides, facing one another.

The contractors were Messrs. Carr & Co., Paarl.

=== Boarding houses ===
Six houses comprise the school listed in chronological order:

- Upper House – and Lower House is mentioned in the Register for the first time for 1895. Lower House ceased to exist in 1905.
- Merriman named after the Rt Rev'd Nathaniel Merriman, previously known as Lower House
- Armstrong named after the Rt Rev'd John Armstrong this house was built in 1898
- Espin named after Canon John Espin, built 1902.
- Mullins, named after Canon R. J. Mullins [aka the Republic of Mullins]
- Graham was a new boy house long before it became the sixth House of the School in 1963.: Roger Clark first Housemaster. Graham house was named after the Graham family who attended St Andrew's since 1861 – they collectively gave St Andrew's years of wisdom, serving either on the council or as President of the OA Club. (TBIY p. 38). Graham house was purchased by Canon Mullins in 1872.

== Curriculum ==
The school follows the curriculum set by the Independent Examinations Board (IEB), which is the curriculum followed by most private schools in South Africa. In 2019 the school also implemented the Cambridge Assessment International Education A-Level curriculum as an alternative syllabus to the IEB.

== Extracurricular activities ==
The school has a pipe band which leads the cadet corps during parades. St Andrew's College is one of the few schools in South Africa that still trains a cadet corps. The cadet corps is attached to the First City Regiment

The school has three cultural societies whose membership is by invitation:

- Alchemists meet twice a term to discuss matters of general, non-scientific interest.
- Astronomers meet 6 times a year where boys present papers of a scientific nature to the club which is discussed over supper.
- Cornish for a group of boys who share a love of poetry.

The School also hosts a number of other clubs and societies such as Choir, Debating, Model United Nations, Round Square, Ballroom Dancing, Chess, Outdoor Club, Surfing among others

The school has produced two Springbok rugby players, Ryan Kankowski and Nick Mallett. The school has produced one Olympic rower, James Thompson.

== School hymn ==
The school hymn is "Jesus Calls Us, O'er the Tumult", the office hymn for the feast of St. Andrew.

== Notable Old Andreans ==
=== Businessmen ===
- Sir Michael Edwardes, business executive
- Graham Mackay, chairman and CEO of SABMiller
- Mark Patterson, co-founder of MatlinPatterson Global Advisers
- Jacko Maree, former CEO of Standard Bank

=== Engineers, scientists, lawyers and medical men ===
- Athelstan Cornish-Bowden, land surveyor
- Sir Basil Schonland, South Africa's Scientist of the 20th Century, Order of Mapungubwe - Gold class (OMG), important in the development of radar.
- Charles Cummings (lawyer), Chief Justice of the Sudan in 1946
- Claude Bettington, mechanical engineer, soldier and aviator
- Ernest Edward Galpin, botanist
- Francis Wilson, economist
- Guybon Atherstone, railway engineer
- James Henry Greathead, engineer renowned for his work on the London Underground railway.
- Kim Bailie, aerospace engineer
- Lennox Broster, surgeon
- Sir Montagu Cotterill, surgeon and cricketer, the son of the bishop of Grahamstown, the Rt Revd Henry Cotterill and brother to George Edward Cotterill, headmaster of college.
- Newton Ogilvie Thompson, Chief Justice of South Africa 1971–1974
- Reginald Frederick Lawrence, biologist
- Sir Stanley Rees, High Court judge in England
- Thomas Graham, lawyer
- William Bleloch, metallurgist
- Bruce Rubidge - palaeontologist

=== Sportsmen ===
- Adrian Birrell, former First-Class cricketer and South African national cricket team assistant coach.
- Andrew Birch, cricketer for the Warriors
- Anton Murray, former South African Test cricketer
- Antony Roy Clark, cricketer
- Bevil Rudd, Olympic Gold Medallist - 400m (Antwerp, 1920)
- Bill Lundie, former South African Test cricketer
- Bill Taberer, rugby player
- Brian Skosana, rugby player
- Cecil Dixon, former South African Test cricketer
- Chase Minnaar, rugby player
- Claude Floquet, former South African Test cricketer
- Clem Currie, former Springbok rugby player
- Chris Benjamin, cricketer
- Cuth Mullins, rugby player
- Daantjie van de Vyver, former Springbok rugby player
- Eric Norton, He returned to St Andrew's to teach, coach rugby and cricked and was Headmaster from 1972 – 1980. Norton made his debut for Eastern Province in the Currie Cup in 1936–37 against Transvaal in Johannesburg at the age of 17. He was selected to tour Australasia in 1952–53. He was also a prominent rugby player, who captained the Junior Springboks in Rhodesia in 1950.
- Fanie Cronje, former Springbok rugby player
- Frank Douglass, former Springbok rugby player
- Harry Birrell, cricketer
- Heinrich Smit, rugby player who represented Namibia at the 2015 World Cup
- Henry Taberer, former South African Test cricketer
- Jack Dold, former Springbok rugby player
- Jackie Powell, former Springbok rugby player
- Jake Green, rower
- James Price, cricketer
- James Thompson, Olympic gold medallist – Men's lightweight coxless four, London 2012 Summer Olympics
- John Rowley, cricketer
- Lewis Gordon Pugh, pioneering swimmer and environmentalist
- Martin Hanley, former South African Test cricketer
- Michael Price, cricketer for the Warriors
- Nick Mallett, former Springbok rugby player and coach
- Pat Fairfield, motor racing driver, winner of the 1937 Rand Grand Prix, died after an accident in the 1937 24 Hours of Le Mans
- Peter van der Merwe, South African cricket captain, 1965–67
- Pompey Norton, former South African Test cricketer
- Roger Barrow, coach of the South African national rowing team.
- Ronald Wylde, athlete
- Ross Geldenhuys, rugby player
- Russell Bennett, former Springbok rugby player
- Ryan Kankowski, Springbok rugby player
- Sintu Manjezi, rugby player
- Thomas Gubb (1926), rugby union international, represented Great Britain on 1927 British Lions tour to Argentina
- Tom Hobson, former Springbok rugby player
- Tyler Paul, rugby player
- Worthington Hoskin, cricketer (and rugby player)

=== Clergy ===
- Peter Hinchliff, priest and academic
- Robin Briggs, Suffragan Bishop of Pretoria
- Wilfrid Parker, Bishop of Pretoria

=== Musicians, actors, authors and artists ===
- Stephen Gray, writer
- Bongani Ndodana-Breen, musician and composer
- Ian Roberts, actor, playwright and singer
- Ernest Glanville, author
- Peter Cartwright, actor
- Jonty Driver, poet and writer
- Ivan Mitford-Barberton, sculptor and writer (Note: Ivan Mitford-Barberton is listed as Barber, Ivan Gray in the Register of S. Andrew's College, Grahamstown, from 1855 to 1914 (Laurie 1914, p. 62))
- Vere Stent, war correspondent and editor of the Pretoria News

=== Nobility and politicians ===
- Henry Burton
- Edward Coke, Earl of Leicester CBE, Holkham Estate, Norfolk. Past chairman of the Historic Houses Association
- Kingsley Fairbridge
- Thomas Graham
- Robert Coryndon, British colonial administrator
- Randolph Vigne, member of the Liberal Party of South Africa
- Howard Unwin Moffat, prime minister of Southern Rhodesia
- Andrew de Blocq, South African politician and ornithologist

=== Soldiers, sailors and airmen ===
- Air Marshal the Reverend Sir Henry Paterson Fraser
- Duane Hudson, British intelligence officer
- Brigadier Sir Miles Hunt-Davis, KCVO, CBE, Private Secretary to the Duke of Edinburgh
- Colonel Sir Ernest Lucas Guest KBE, CMG, CVO, LLD
- Air Vice Marshal John Howe CB, CBE, AFC, RAF
- Major-General William Henry Evered Poole CB, CBE, DSO
- Rear Admiral M.R. Terry-Lloyd SSA SM
- Rear Admiral Kenneth Snow, RN
- Surgeon Rear Admiral Ronald Edward Snow, QHP, CB, LVO, RN
- Lieutenant General Sir Maurice Grove-White

=== Victoria Cross holders ===
Two Old Andreans have been awarded the Victoria Cross:

- Major Charles Mullins, VC recipient in the Boer War
- Lieutenant-Colonel John Sherwood-Kelly, VC recipient in the First World War

== Notable staff ==
- Charles Fortune, broadcaster and writer, especially noted for his cricket commentaries on radio.
- Danie Craven, international rugby administrator.
- Harry Lee, cricketer
- George Cory, chemist and historian
- Arthur Matthews, first lecturer in mathematics and physical science, and later professor of mathematics at Rhodes University
- Roger Wilson, bishop

== Headmasters ==
- The Revd F. Bankes (1855–1859)
- The Revd Frederick York St Leger (1859–1862)
- The Revd George Edward Cotterill (1863–1865), the son of the Rt Revd Henry Cotterill, bishop of Grahamstown
- The Revd Langford S. Browne (1865–1875)
- The Revd G. Gould Ross (1875–1881)
- The Revd Canon John Espin (1882–1902)
- The Revd W. S. Macgowan (1902–1908)
- The Revd Canon Percy W.H. Kettlewell (1909–1933)
- The Revd Canon C. B. Armstrong (1934–1938)
- Ronald F. Currey (Oxon) (1939–1955)
- Freddie Spencer Chapman (1956–1962)
- J. L. Cawse (1962–1964)
- The Revd Canon John Aubrey (1965–1971)
- Eric Norton (1972–1980)
- Arthur F. G. Cotton (1981–1993)
- Antony R. Clark (Cantab) (1994–2002)
- David B. Wylde (Oxon) (2003–2008)
- Paul A. Edey (2009–2014)
- Alan Thompson (2015 – January 2022)
- Aidan Smith, interim headmaster (2022)
- Tom Hamilton (January 2023 – present)

=== Gallery ===
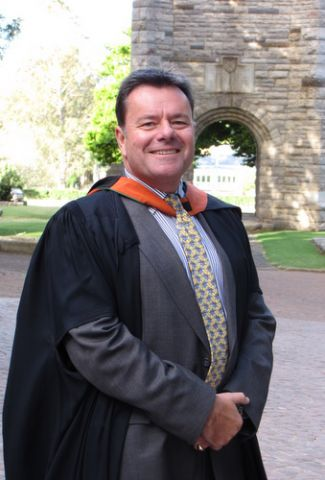
18th headmaster, Paul Edey.

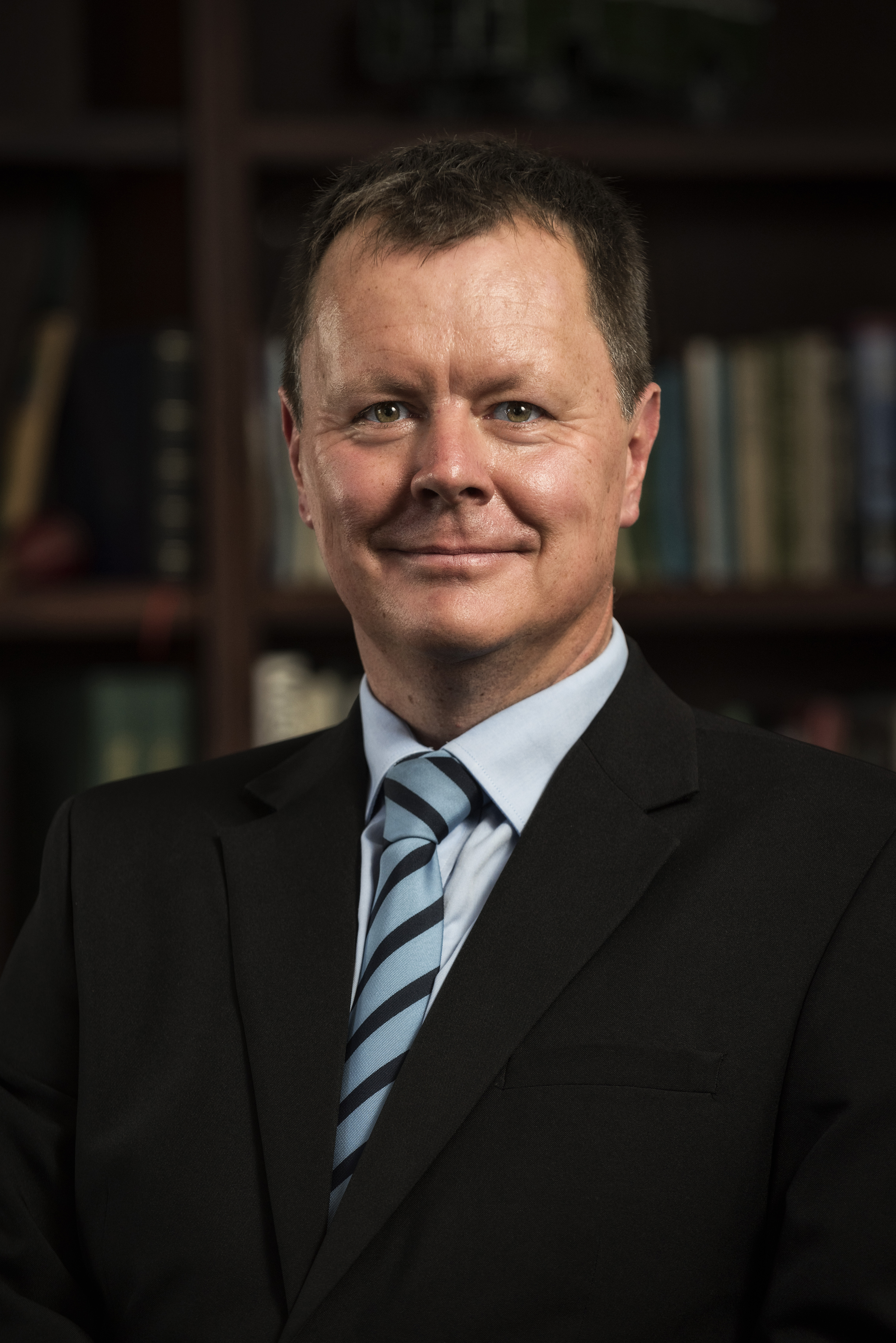
19th headmaster, Alan Thompson

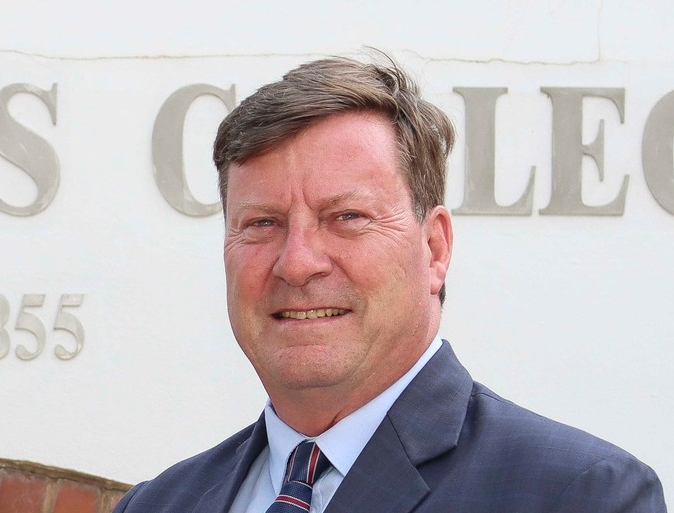
20th headmaster, Tom Hamilton

== See also ==
- Rhodes Scholarship
- List of boarding schools
