= The Great Kimberley Diamond Robbery =

1911 South African first film

- Directed by: R. C. E. Nissen
- Written by: R. C. E. Nissen
- Produced by: Rufe Naylor
- Starring: Emma Krogh
- Cinematography: R. C. E. Nissen
- Distributed by: Springbok Film Company
- Release date: 11 December 1911 (South Africa)
- Running time: 15 min.
- Country: South Africa
- Language: Silent (English intertitles)

The Great Kimberley Diamond Robbery (Die Groot Diamantroof van Kimberley), also theatrically as The Star of the South, is a 1911 South African Black and white silent film directed by R. C. E. Nissen and produced by Rufe Naylor for Springbok Film Company. This is the first South African dramatic film in South African cinema history.

== Plot ==
A diamond is found near the Vaal River and sold to Dick Grangeway. Dick decides to take the diamond to Cape Town or London and sell it on. Two desperadoes learns of the diamond and plans to rob Dick. They abduct Dick's wife, Kate, to obtain the whereabouts of the diamond.

== Cast ==
- Emma Krogh as Kate Grangeway
