= Stanley Rees =

British barrister and judge

Sir Stanley Rees
- Born: Charles William Stanley Rees; 30 November 1907; Port Elizabeth, South Africa
- Died: 13 December 2000 (aged 93); Haywards Heath, West Sussex, England
- Occupation: Judge

Sir Charles William Stanley Rees (30 November 1907 – 13 December 2000) was a British barrister and High Court judge.

== Early life ==
Rees was born on 30 November 1907. He went to St. Andrew's College, Grahamstown, after which he went to University College, Oxford, where he read Law. He practised law in London from 1931.

== Military and legal career ==
At the outbreak of the Second World War, Rees became an officer in the Royal Artillery, 99th Anti-Aircraft Regiment.

In 1957, Rees became a barrister and in 1962 was appointed a judge in the Family Division of the High Court and was knighted in the same year.

== Sources ==
- Poland, Marguerite (2008). The Boy in You: A Biography of St. Andrew's College, 1855-2005. Fernwood Press. ISBN 978-1-874950-86-8.
- Butler, Ian; Drakeford, Mark (2012). Social Work on Trial: The Colwell Inquiry and the State of Welfare. Policy Press. ISBN 978-1-84742-867-7.
