= William Smith (teacher) =

South African science and mathematics teacher (1939–2024)

William Smith GCOB
- Born: William Macdonald Smith; 25 June 1939; Grahamstown, South Africa
- Died: 21 August 2024 (aged 85); Perth, Western Australia, Australia
- Education: St. Andrew's Preparatory School; Union High School, Graaff-Reinet
- Alma mater: Rhodes University; University of Natal
- Occupation(s): Television science and mathematics teacher
- Notable work: Order of the Baobab (silver)
- Parents: J. L. B. Smith; Margaret Mary Smith

William Macdonald Smith GCOB (25 June 1939 – 21 August 2024) was a South African science and mathematics teacher who was best known for his maths and science lessons on television. Born in Makhanda (Grahamstown), he is the son of the ichthyologist Margaret Mary Smith and Professor J. L. B. Smith, the renowned chemist and ichthyologist who identified the coelacanth.

== Early life and education ==
William Smith was born on 25 June 1939. He attended St. Andrew's Prep before matriculating at Union High School in Graaff-Reinet. Smith then went on to study at Rhodes University, where he obtained a Bachelor of Science degree in physics and chemistry, followed by an honours degree (cum laude) in chemistry at the same institution. Following that, he obtained a master's degree from the University of Natal (Pietermaritzburg campus) in only seven months.

During his time at school and university, Smith showed an interest in film and camerawork, scripting, shooting, and producing the 50-minute feature documentary, ‘The Garden Route,’ in 1960. The film was digitised and relaunched in 2010.

He started working at African Explosives and Chemical Industries (AECI). Deciding that he would rather pursue a teaching career, Smith left the industry and moved to the education sector, where he started 'Star Schools,' named for the mass-circulation Johannesburg newspaper, The Star, which published material that Smith prepared to support his lessons. The aim of these schools is to provide value-for-money supplementary education with top-class teachers to prepare learners for their matriculation exams. During the next 25 years, Smith became famous throughout South Africa, winning a 'Teacher of the Year' award in 1991.

Smith ran his first multi-racial school in the 1970s, despite problems with the Apartheid authorities. At that time, education facilities were segregated under legislation such as the Bantu Education Act (1953), and black children were prohibited from attending classes on campuses that had been reserved for whites. Smith, however, never turned any black student away from any class, and made Star Schools more accessible by offering instruction in subjects that weren’t adequately covered by the Bantu Education system - such as mathematics and physical science. (Bantu Education was reserved for black learners, while Christian National Education was reserved for whites. Under Apartheid legislation, South Africa had as many as nineteen different education departments).

In 1990, Smith began producing The Learning Channel educational television programmes with the financial backing of Hylton Appelbaum, then executive director of the Liberty Life Foundation. As a result of his work on this programme, Smith was voted as one of the top three presenters on South African television in 1998.

== Other achievements ==
Smith was also a renowned conservationist and owned the Featherbed Nature Reserve in Knysna, where he lived until the sale of the land and company in 2008. He was also the owner of 'Rivercat Ferries', which has several craft that cruise in the Knysna lagoon and out to sea.

He appeared along with Jeremy Mansfield in the popular South African television quiz show, A Word or 2. Smith was also a judge for the Miss South Africa Pageant in 1998 and 1999.

== Death ==
Smith died in Perth, Australia on 21 August 2024, at the age of 85. The cause of death was cancer.

== Awards and recognition ==
1991
Smith won the Technotron/Barlow Rand/Pretoria University ‘Teacher of the Year’ award.
1992
Received the South African Association for the Advancement of Science (S2A3) Certificate of Merit for the highest contribution to the advancement of science in South Africa. (Smith’s mother, Prof. MM Smith, had received the same award in 1983.)
2004
Smith was voted 86th in the Top 100 Great South Africans.
2004
Awarded honorary life membership of the Golden Key International organisation in recognition of his contributions.
2006
Received the Department of Communications’ Golden Plumes Award in recognition of his contribution to the South African television broadcast industry from 1976 – 2006.
25 April 2019
Smith was invited by South African President Cyril Ramaphosa with the Order of the Baobab in Silver on 25 April 2019 in recognition of his services to teaching and the "demystification of mathematics and science".
28 April 2021
Smith received a Doctor of Laws (LLD) (honoris causa) from his alma mater, Rhodes University, on 28 April 2021. “During 20 years with Mr Smith at the helm, Star Schools was responsible for some of the most innovative advancements in education ever seen in South Africa, including the Pre-University School, which prepared first year students and was adopted by universities across the country.”
