= Thomas Graham (barrister) =

South African judge and politician (1860–1940)

The Honourable Sir Thomas Graham KC
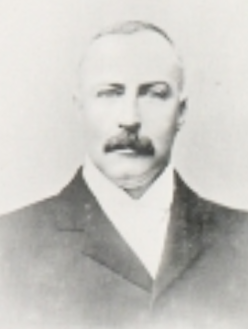

Prime Minister of Cape Colony Acting
- In office June – August 1902
- Monarch: Edward VII
- Governor: Walter Hely-Hutchinson
- Preceded by: Gordon Sprigg
- Succeeded by: Gordon Sprigg

Judge President of the Eastern Districts Local Division of the Supreme Court of South Africa
- In office 1913–1937
- Preceded by: John Gilbert Kotzé

Judge of the Eastern Districts Court of the Supreme Court of South Africa
- In office 1904–1913

Attorney-General of Cape Colony
- In office 1902–1904
- Prime Minister: Gordon Sprigg
- Preceded by: James Rose Innes
- Succeeded by: Victor Sampson
- In office January – June 1898
- Prime Minister: Gordon Sprigg
- Preceded by: Thomas Upington
- Succeeded by: Richard Solomon

Colonial Secretary of Cape Colony
- In office 1900–1902

Parliament of Cape Colony
- In office 1898–1904

Personal details
- Born: 5 May 1860 Grahamstown, Cape Colony
- Died: 7 May 1940 (aged 80) Union of South Africa
- Party: Progressive
- Education: St. Andrew's College; Clare College, Cambridge
- Profession: lawyer, judge

Sir Thomas Lynedoch Graham KC (5 May 1860 – 7 May 1940) was a South African judge and politician.

== Early life and education ==
Graham was born in Grahamstown, Cape Colony, which had been founded by his ancestor, Colonel John Graham, in 1812. He was educated at St Andrew's College, Grahamstown and Clare College, Cambridge and was called to the bar by the Inner Temple in 1885.

== Legal and political career ==
Returning to South Africa, he became an advocate of the Supreme Court of Cape Colony. In 1898, he took silk and was elected to the Cape Colony Legislative Council, the Upper House of the Parliament of Cape Colony. Soon afterwards he was appointed Attorney-General in Sir Gordon Sprigg's third government. However, in June 1898 a vote of no confidence was passed in the government, which resigned.

Two years later, Sprigg was back in government, with Graham as Colonial Secretary. In 1902 he became Attorney-General again and from June to August he acted as Prime Minister while Sprigg attended the Coronation of King Edward VII in London.

In 1904 Sprigg's government fell again and Graham was appointed a judge. In 1913 he was appointed Judge-President of the Eastern Districts Local Division of the Supreme Court of South Africa, with his seat in his hometown. He held this post until his retirement in 1937.

He was knighted in the 1920 New Year Honours.

== Sport participation ==
In September 1882, Graham participated in the Oxford and Cambridge Challenge Cup tennis tournament, played on grass in Oxford, where he lost in the first round to Robert Wallace Glen Lee Braddell, the son of Sir Thomas Braddell. In 1891 he won the South African Doubles Lawn Tennis Championship. Graham was also a keen cricketer and represented the Cape Town-based, Western Province Cricket Club, as a fast bowler.

== Family ==
In 1891, Graham married Annye Ismena Prior Gavin, daughter of the Reverend Jeremiah Fitz-Austin Gavin. The couple had a daughter and two sons.
