= Cecily Norden =

Equestrian and author (1918–2011)

Cecily Bourchier Norden
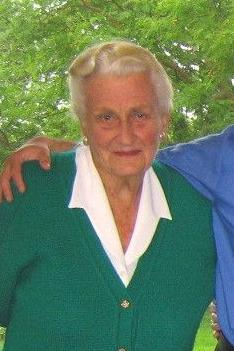
- Cecily Norden
- Born: Cecily Bourchier Bowker; 23 December 1918; Grahamstown, South Africa
- Died: 27 August 2011 (aged 92)
- Occupations: Author, senior horse judge, champion rider and exhibitor, stud breeder
- Writing career
- Notable works: 1971 "Showing Horses in South Africa" First Edition, 1980 "Showing Horses in South Africa" Second Edition, 2010 "The Barefoot Days" Short Stories. Published privately.
- Notable awards: She has the distinction of being the first ever woman judge to officiate at the National Saddle Horse Championships in South Africa (1968).

Cecily Bourchier Norden (née Bowker; 23 December 1918 – 27 August 2011) was an author, senior horse judge, champion rider and exhibitor and stud breeder. She is known for her contribution to the riding horse industry in South Africa.

== Biography ==
Norden was born in Grahamstown, South Africa, on 23 December 1918. She was the only daughter of the late Dr Thomas Bourchier Bowker, Member of Parliament for Albany from 1936 until his death in 1964. He was awarded an Honorary Doctor of Laws by Rhodes University in 1963/1964 for his work over 25 years in the initiation of the Orange and Fish River Water Scheme and the building of the Gariep Dam; his work as the Founder of the 1820 Settlers National Monument Concept; and his work in piloting the Rhodes University Bill through Parliament.

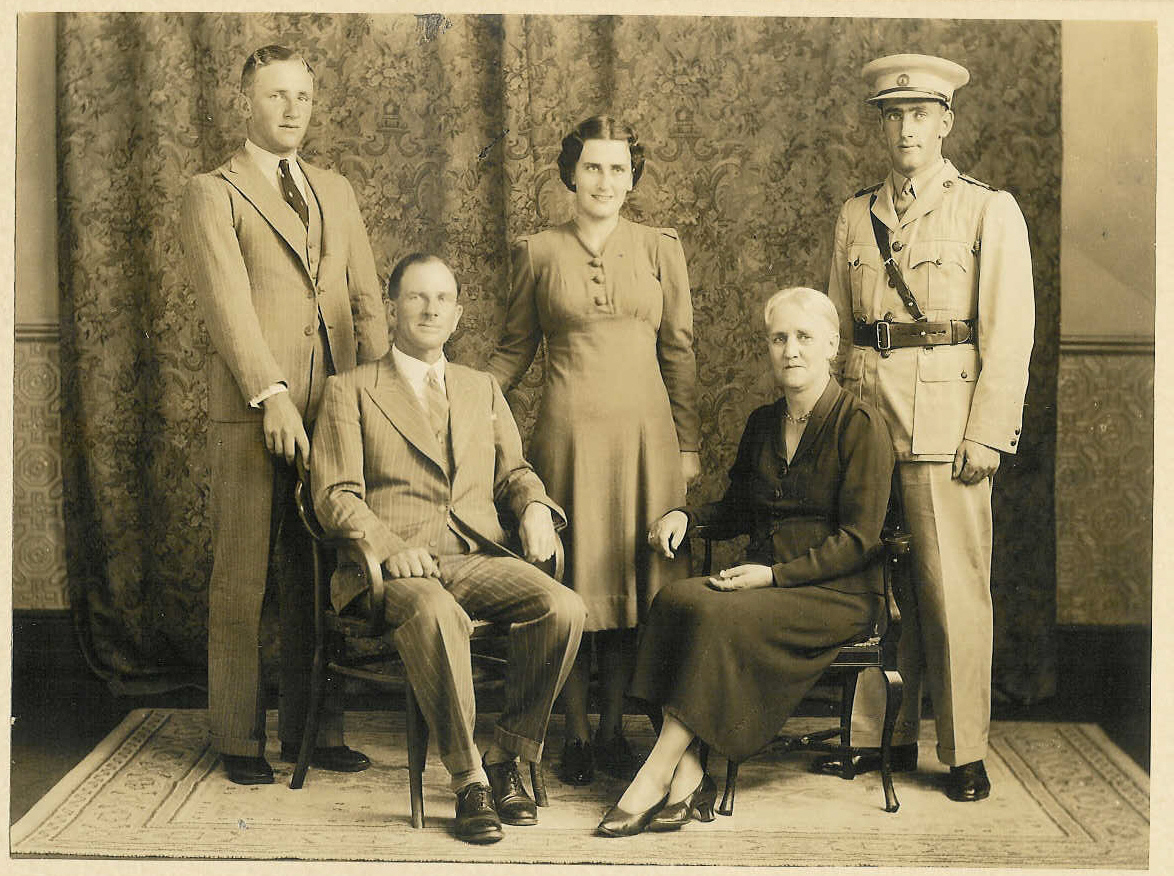
Bowker Family 1939

Cecily's mother was the late Gladys Elaine Bowker (née Hart), the great-granddaughter of Robert Hart II, the founder and patriarch of Somerset East, Eastern Cape, and famous benefactor of the 1820 Settlers during their troubled years. Gladys was a graduate of Rhodes University College in Grahamstown, in a combined BA/BSc degree.

Cecily and her two brothers, John and Hubert, grew up on the farms Glen Ovis and Signal Hill, situated in the Great Fish River Valley, 36 miles north of Grahamstown, where they farmed with Merino sheep, Blackhead Persians, Holstein cattle, Arabian horses and ostriches.

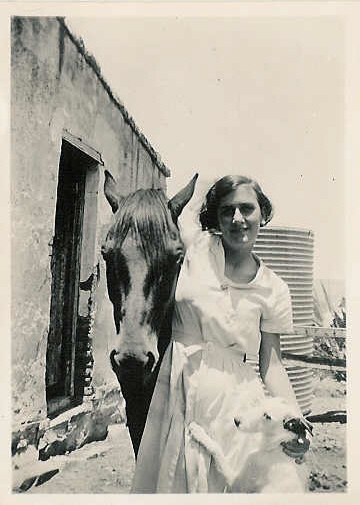
Cecily got Cromwell as a gift from her father when she was 10

Cecily started riding when she was three and has been writing stories since the age of seven.

She attended school for the first time at the age of 12, at Diocesan School for Girls (DSG) in Grahamstown where she played first teams of all sports provided, and later obtained her Tennis Colours at Rhodes University. She obtained the highest Matriculation pass of the combined Grahamstown schools in 1936. At Rhodes University she majored in English (Distinction) and Fine Art (1937–1940), and obtained her UED. She taught English at the Port Elizabeth Technical College.

She married Jack Norden (1941–1954) and has 3 children, 5 grandchildren and 2 great-grandchildren.

She lived for 50 years in Middelburg, Eastern Cape, district and town, where she served on the Town Council, the Anglican Church Council, the Midlands' Farmers' Association (Honorary Secretary), the Sports Union (Manager) and numerous councils for different horse breeds and national horse judging, and organisations for divisions of the Saddle Horse Industry.

She has had many hundreds of articles published on horse husbandry and other agricultural and historical subjects. She has often lectured on radio, and has written and illustrated technical and children's story books. Her best known book is Showing Horses in South Africa, 1st and 2nd editions (1971 and 1980).

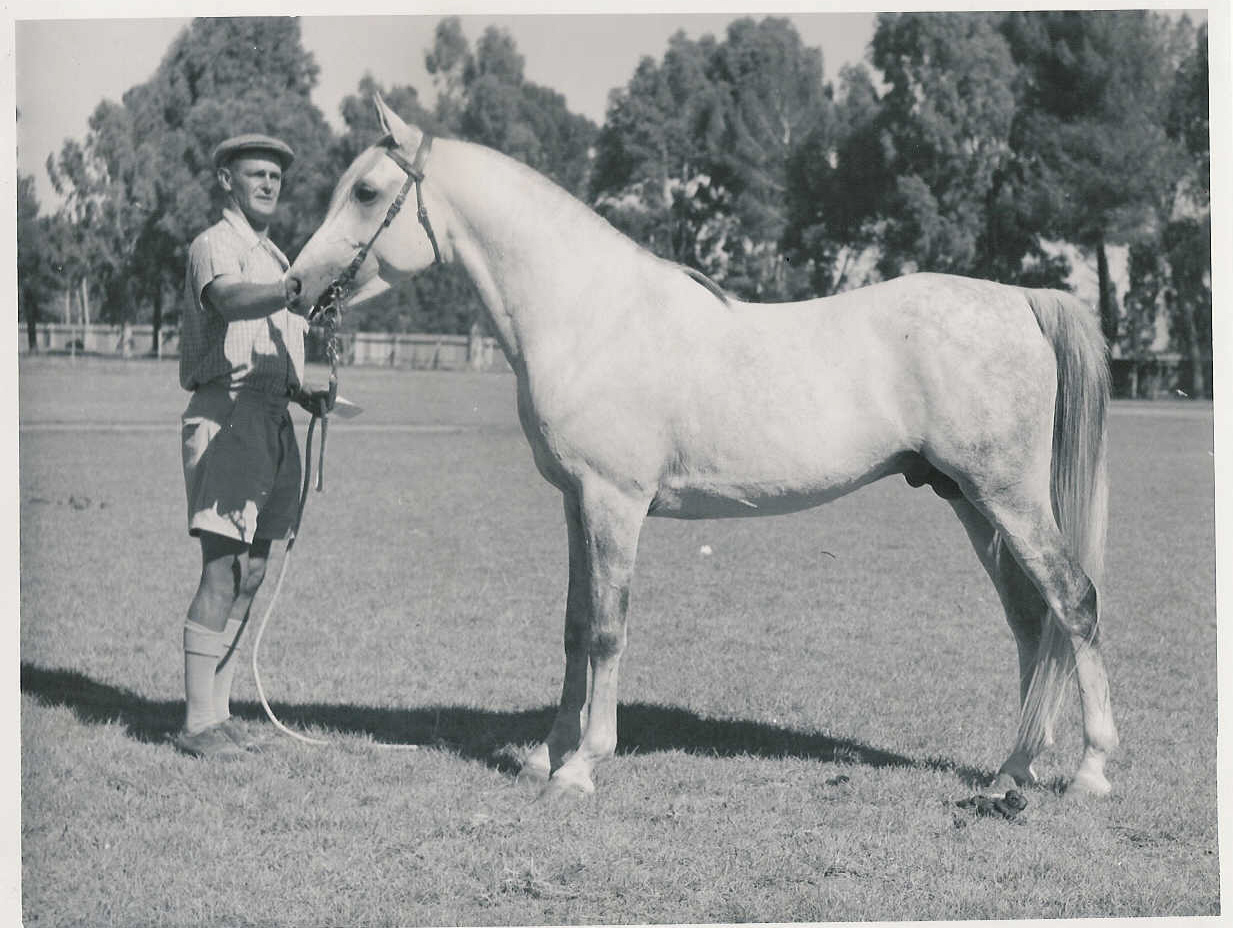
Boaz 1949

She was an equitation and show rider and breeder of horses. She owned the Maastricht Arabian Horse Stud in the Albany District which was registered with the Riding Horse Breeders' Society of South Africa. At this time she was privileged to use the famous Arabian sire, Jiddan, on her mares. Details can be verified in Showing Horses in South Africa 2nd Edition, Chapter XIV.

After moving to Oranje Farm, in the Middelburg District, in 1950 she bought the stud stallion Boaz, a pure bred Arabian imported from England. In 1953 she won the Victor Ludorum for the most points at the National Arabian Horse Championships of South Africa held that year at Middelburg.

At Oranje she also bred several champion SA Saddle Horses and Boerperde which were winners at their respective National Championship Horse Shows. She died in Port Alfred on 27 August 2011 – refer "Talk of the Town" newspaper dated 30 September 2011.

== Contribution to the Riding Horse Industry in South Africa ==
Middelburg, Eastern Cape, South Africa on 27 April 2002 in that two of its citizens, Mrs Cecily Norden and Mr Pietie Joubert, were selected by the Saddle Horse Breeders' Society of South Africa, from the whole of South Africa, to receive the President's Award for outstanding service to the development of the Saddle Horse Industry of South Africa. This is the first occasion on which this award has been made. Four of their contemporaries from other provinces also received this award.

The Saddle Horse Breeders' Society of South Africa saw its inception on 23 November 1942 under an extended name incorporating other breeds of riding horses, as well as what was then known as American Saddle Horses. It is now a multimillion-dollar industry affiliated to the South African Stud Book Association and it imports hundreds of Saddle Horses from America and also exports Saddlers of world champion status to the United States. There are strong bonds between the two countries and breeders, trainers and horse judges make constant exchanges.

=== Citation 1942–1983 ===
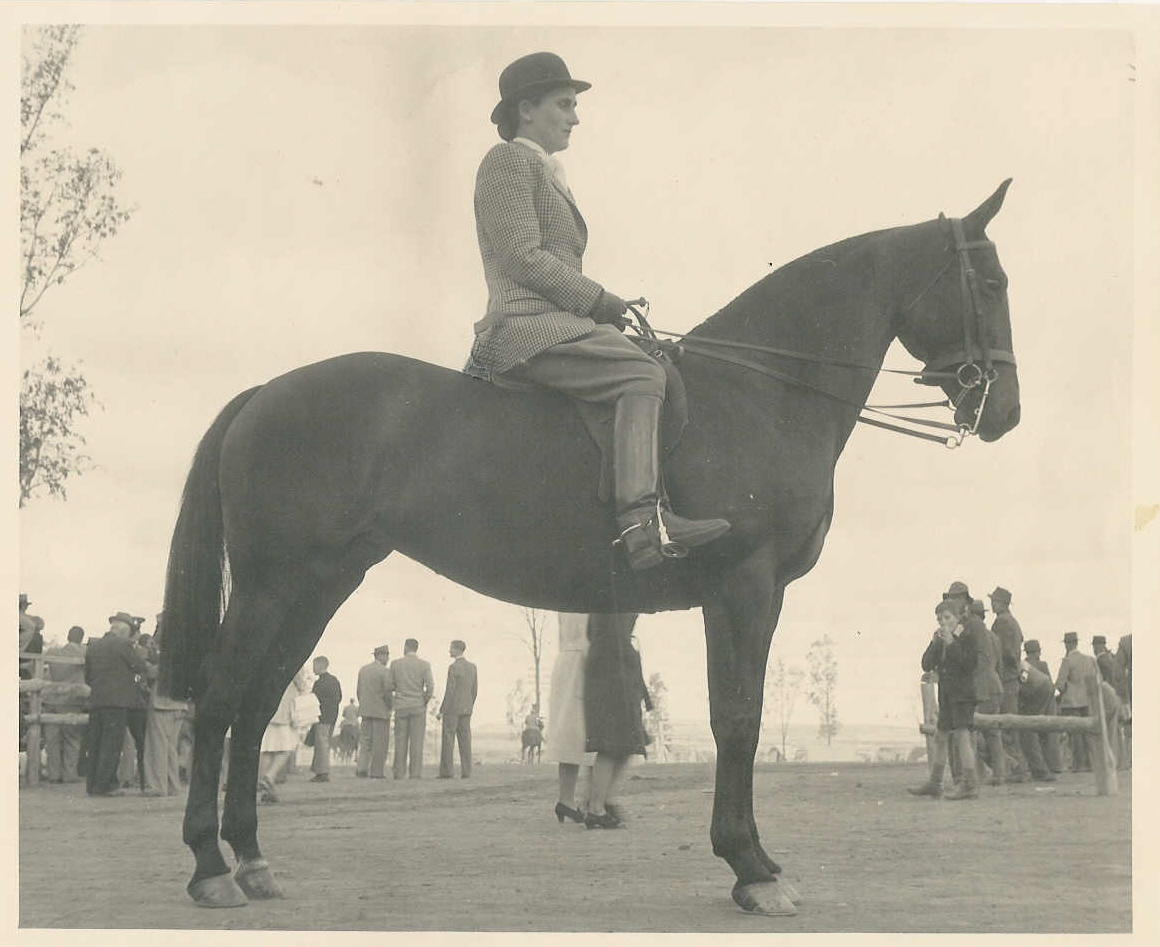
Cecily on Flicka

Cecily Norden took an active part in the formative years in promoting the Saddle Horse Industry in South Africa, serving on various Executive Councils and Select Working Committees from 1942 to 1983, as well as being a stud breeder and personally exhibiting riding horses country-wide in Saddle Horse, Boerperd, Arabian and Equitation classes. She qualified as a Senior Judge of Saddle Horses, Boerperde, Palominos, Arabian horses, Welsh Ponies and Equitation, and has judged at National Breed Championships for all these breeds, as well as judging at regional shows for all breeds during the entire period 1942 to 1995. She has the distinction of being the first woman judge to officiate at the National Saddle Horse Championships in Bloemfontein, South Africa (1968).

=== Specific contributions made to the development of the industry ===
Cecily Norden and the late W.J. van der Merwe worked together as a team, as Honorary Secretary and chairman-cum-President respectively, from 1945 until their retirement in 1983, in an unbroken series of projects over a period of forty years. The chief among these projects, in addition to judging at shows and officially inspecting horses and personally exhibiting at shows country-wide, included the following:

==== Division of the Breeds 1948 – 1949 ====
One of the milestones in the development of the Horse Breeding Industry in South Africa was activated in 1948 when Cecily Norden and W.J. van der Merwe were elected as a Select Committee to organise the division of the breeds, the most important one being the Saddle Horse Breeders’ Society of South Africa. They personally did all the research and documentation of the breeding policies, constitutions, standards of conformation, regulations and inspection procedures of the light breeds now, for the first time, divided into Saddle Horses, Boerperde, Arabians and Thoroughbred Hacks. These breeds would now be judged in separate classes in the show ring, with their own strict breed rules and regulations. This would ensure that purity of breed and breed character could be maintained and registered officially, each in its own Breed Society, under the umbrella of the mother society, the Riding Horse Breeders' Society of South Africa. (All the Breed Meetings were held in the upper sitting room of the old Commercial Hotel in Middelburg, in clouds of cigarette smoke.)

==== 1948–1954 Arabian Horse Breeders' Society of South Africa ====
Cecily Norden and W.J. van der Merwe were Secretary and Chairman of this newly formed Society, and, during these years, abundant publicity ensured that Middelburg District became the centre of Arab Horse Breeding in South Africa, home to top quality imported Arabian stallions, including the fountain-head sire, Jiddan, whose offspring, mainly mares, formed the basis of many studs due to their great prepotency.

==== 1951 Conception of National Breed championships ====
W.J. van der Merwe and Cecily Norden brought into being and organised a new concept, that of National Breed Championships for light-legged horses (the first ever to be held in South Africa) – the forerunner of the present National Saddle Horse Championships of South Africa now held in Bloemfontein since 1962.

The first Championships were held each year at the Middelburg Cape Show, facilitated by the fact that Cecily Norden and W.J. van der Merwe were Secretary and Chairman of this show for twelve years, which covered this period of change.

The following National Championships were held which created great publicity country-wide
- 1953 Arabian Horse National Championships of South Africa
- 1954 American Saddle Horse National Championships of South Africa
- 1955 Boerperd National Championships of South Africa
- 1957 Welsh Pony National Championships of South Africa
- 1958 Palomino Horse National Championships of South Africa
- 1959 onwards – several repetitions of Palomino and Boerperd National Championships

==== 1957–1958 Creation of two new Horse Societies ====
Cecily Norden and W.J. van der Merwe, as Secretary and chairman, inaugurated two new societies and instituted their committees:

- 1957 Welsh Pony and Cob Society of South Africa
- 1958 South African Palomino Horse Breeders' Society

These were incorporated into the Riding Horse Breeders' Society of South Africa on whose council Cecily Norden and W.J. van der Merwe served, and under whose banner the now booming Saddle Horse Breeders' Society operated. The two new societies operated under their own chairpersons and committees.

==== 1965 Creation of the Riding Horse Judges' Association of South Africa ====
The next important milestone in stabilising the Saddle Horse Industry, and promoting integrity and efficiency, was the creation of the Riding Horse Judges’ Association of South Africa under the inaugural guidance of W.J. van der Merwe and Cecily Norden in 1965. They served as chairman and Secretary of this body from 1965 until their retirement in 1983.

==== 1977 Riding Horse Stewards' Association of South Africa ====
This was instituted with W.J. van der Merwe and Cecily Norden as inaugural chairman and Secretary, with its own constitution, regulations, short courses and examinations, to aid the judges at agricultural Horse Shows in their tasks, and its own council, independent of the Judges' Association.

==== 1945–1983 The Registered Saddle Horse Breeders' Society of South Africa and Rhodesia ====
Founded 23 November 1942, it was later to become the Riding Horse Breeders' Society of South Africa (revised constitution in 1949 and 1957) on whose council W.J. van der Merwe and Cecily Norden served, and under whose auspices they were able to institute and incorporate new divisions and concepts with the support of the Council, whose members were drawn from breeders of all affiliated horse breeds. At this period of the crucial development of the Industry, the Chairman of the Riding Horse Breeders' Society was Mr Charl van den Heever, and the Chairman of the Saddle Horse Breeders' Society was Mr Hermann de Witt of Beaufort West. The Secretaries were Ms Christine Sieberhagen and Mr Aubrey Richardson.

==== 1950–1983 Short courses and examinations ====
W.J. van der Merwe and Cecily Norden, as chairman and Secretary respectively, organised annual short courses and examinations (25 written and practical papers covering all breeds, saddle seat equitation etc.) to qualify Senior and Junior Judges, and carried a large part of the lectures, and the setting and marking of the examinations. In these tasks, as well as in the organisation of regular symposiums, they were supported by a loyal committee of horse breeders, including Charl van den Heever and Aubrey Richardson and other heads of divisions.

==== 1976 Three-Judge System ====
W.J. van der Merwe, Cecily Norden and Aubrey Richardson (as Tabulator) pioneered the Three-Judge System for Saddle Horses at Middelburg Cape Regional Saddle Horse Championships, which led to the Hi-Low System now in use.

== Published works ==
=== 1971 "Showing Horses in South Africa" First Edition by Cecily Norden ===
The Judges Association created such a desire for knowledge that an illustrated and instructive Rule Book was called for, and in 1971 the first book on judging horses to be published in South Africa was published. Written by Cecily Norden, with great input from W.J. van der Merwe, and dedicated support from all the relevant committees of the Horse Breed Societies, and especially the Saddle Horse Society, which also provided the sponsorship required by the publishers. Cecily Norden marketed the edition, and the sponsorship investment was rapidly repaid as sales boomed and the edition was sold out. (Publishers: Bumley’s, Port Elizabeth)

=== 1980 "Showing Horses in South Africa" Second Edition by Cecily Norden ===
The second edition of Showing Horses in South Africa Revised and Enlarged, was published by Tafelberg Publishers. This was a much more comprehensive edition.

These two books unified the Saddle Horse breeding industry and helped standardize judging, stewarding, exhibiting, and show organization. They remain widely read and are sought after in both England and the United States, especially by breeders, industry professionals, and archival institutions.

Books by Cecily Norden

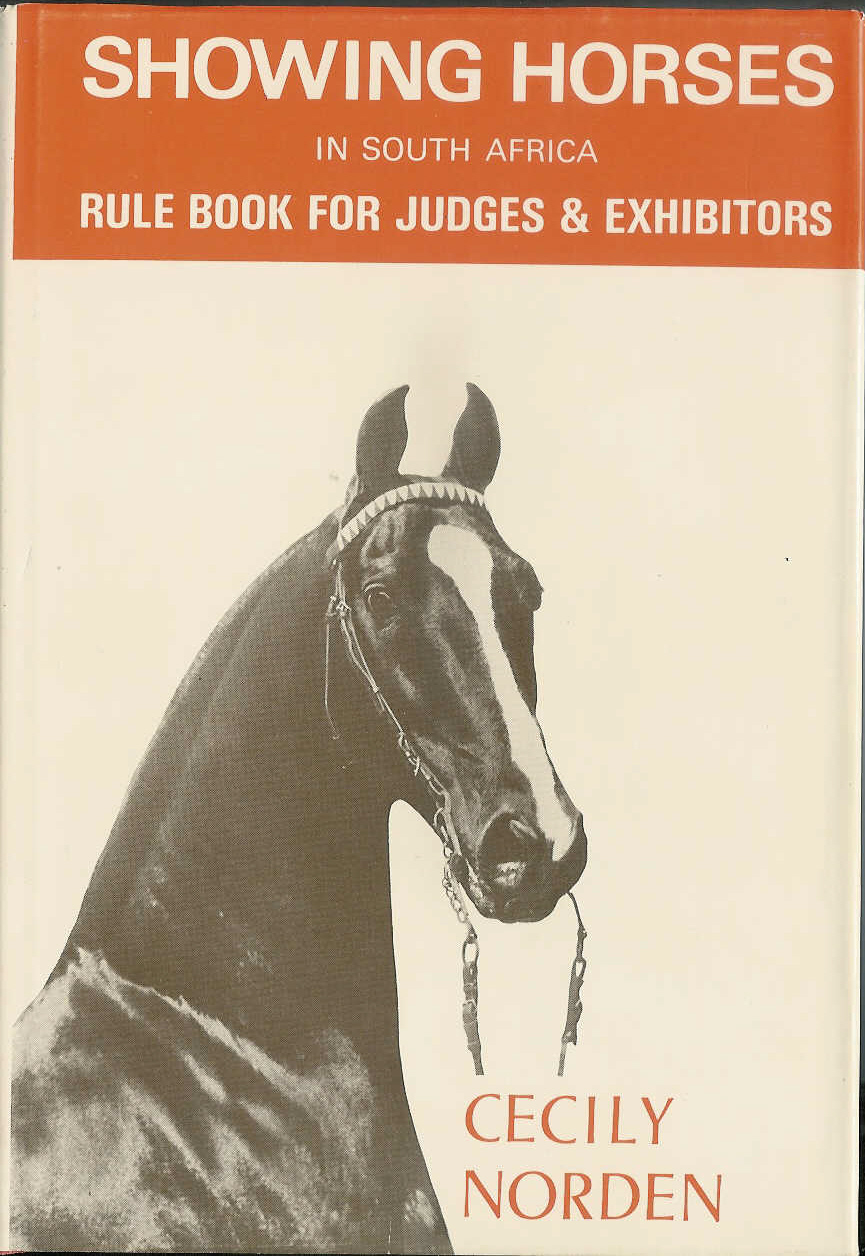
1971

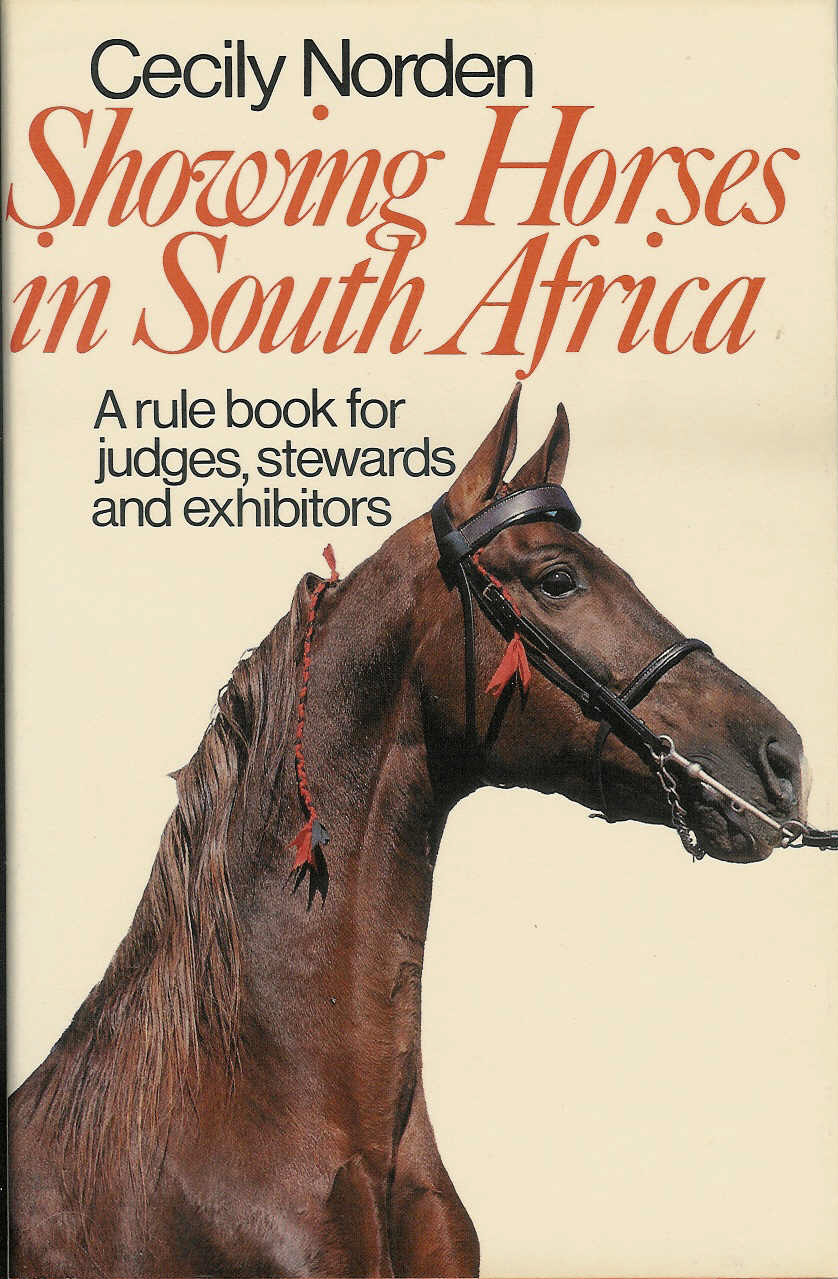
1980

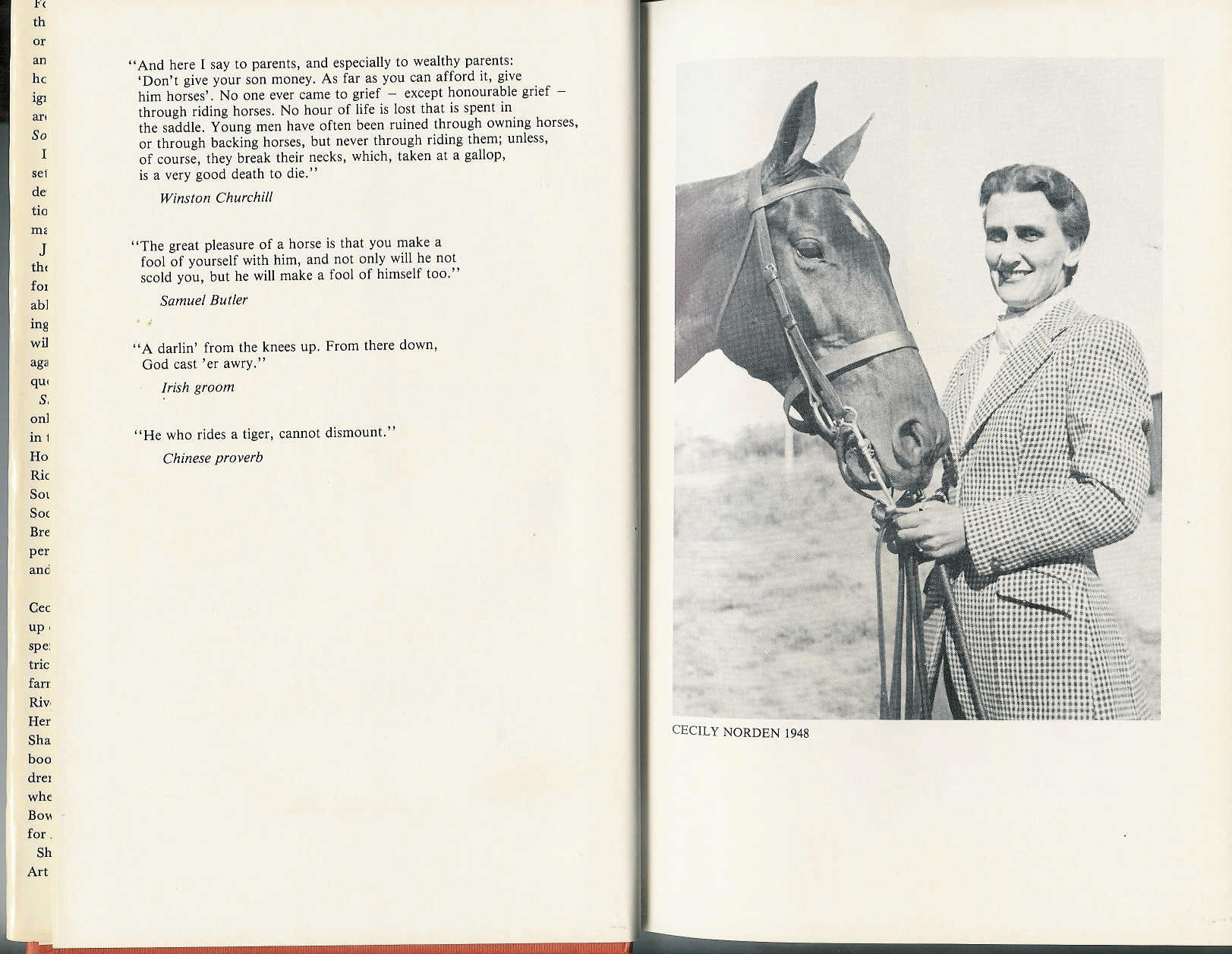
Cecily Norden in 1948

=== 1947–1995 Articles in Agricultural Journals ===
Cecily Norden published illustrated articles in the Farmers Weekly (SA), Landbou Weekblad, S.A. Saddle Horse and other Horse Journals in South Africa and overseas, on the breeding, standards of conformation, husbandry, regulation, exhibition, judging, equitation and development of Saddle Horses and other Riding Horse Breeds, all endorsed by the Riding Horse Breeders' Society of South Africa. These appeared on a regular basis, as did radio broadcasts on all divisions of horse breeding, and constant publicity articles in newspapers.

Two other lesser books were also published:

- The Judging of Saddle Horses (1970) (200 copies)
- Official Amendments – Pocket size (1975) (1000 copies)

== Awards on Retirement ==
On the retirement of Cecily Norden and W.J. van der Merwe, in 1983, they received the following awards:

- Honorary Life Presidency – Riding Horse Judges’ Association of South Africa
- Honorary Life Presidency – Riding Horse Stewards’ Association of South Africa
- Honorary Life Vice Presidency – Riding Horse Breeders’ Society of South Africa
- Honorary Life Member – Saddle Horse Breeders’ Society of South Africa
- Honorary Life Member – Arabian Horse Breeders’ Society of South Africa
- Honorary Life Vice Presidency – Middelburg Cape Agricultural Society
- The presidents Award (27 April 2002) – Saddle Horse Breeders’ Society of South Africa for outstanding service to the Saddle Horse Industry

== Memorial ==
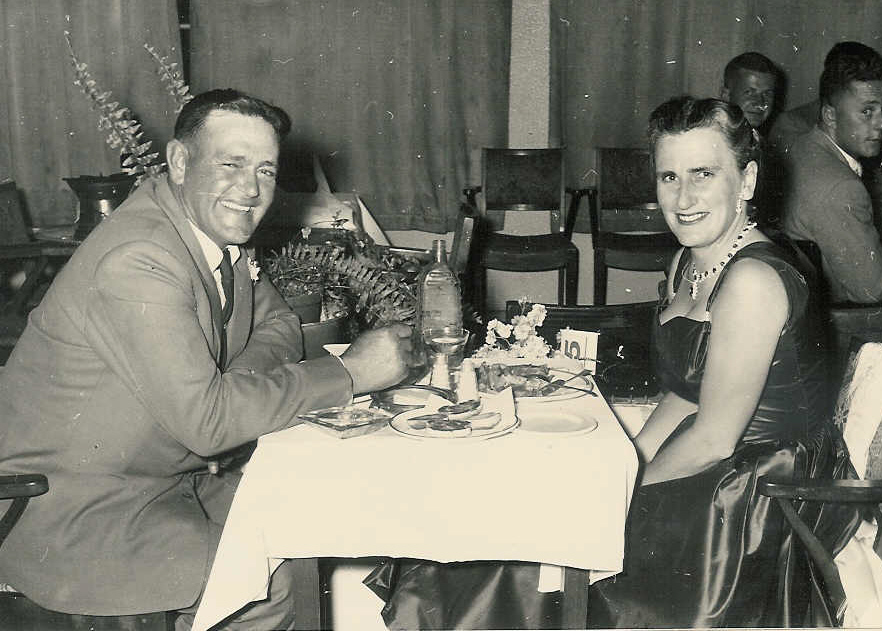
Cecily and Willie at the 1956 Arab Horse Breeders' Society Dinner in Port Elizabeth

W. J. (Willie) van der Merwe retired in 1983 due to increasing ill health. His personality, his integrity, his gift for inspiring enthusiasm, his discipline, wisdom, insight and clarity of thought contributed to his powerful leadership.

“I found it impossible to continue alone and also retired. When one has been pulling a wagon as a pair for almost 50 years, there is neither the incentive nor the strength to do it alone. One needs the wind beneath one's wings." Cecily Norden

W. J. Van der Merwe died in Middelburg in 1995, with Cecily Norden at his side.

In 2009 Cecily Norden lives in Port Alfred in the Eastern Cape, with her family, and has recently celebrated her 90th birthday. She writes every day, focussing mainly on fiction and children's books for her ever-increasing number of great-grandchildren. In December 2010, at the age of 92, Cecily Norden had THE BAREFOOT DAYS, a book of short stories about life and growing up in the Karoo, published privately. It has gone into its second print.

== General references ==
- 1971 "Showing Horses in South Africa" First Edition by Cecily Norden (ISBN 0 620 0055 05) Printed by Bumleys Printing Works (Pty.) Ltd., Port Elizabeth
- 1980 "Showing Horses in South Africa" Second Edition by Cecily Norden – Revised (ISBN 0-624-01352-9) Printed by Tafelberg Publishers, Cape Town

== Notes ==
Private papers, lectures, letters, photographs and notes belonging to Cecily Norden, with permission.
