= Daantjie van de Vyver =

South African rugby union player

- Born: Daniël Ferdinand van de Vyver; 14 December 1909 Seymour, Cape Colony
- Died: 18 March 1977 (aged 67) Cape Town, South Africa
- School: St. Andrew's College, Grahamstown

Rugby union career
- Position: Flyhalf
Amateur team(s)
| Years | Team | Apps | (Points) |
- Villager FC
- Caledon RC
Provincial / State sides
| Years | Team | Apps | (Points) |
| 1934–1938 | Western Province | | |
International career
| Years | Team | Apps | (Points) |
| 1937 | South Africa | 1 | (0) |
| 1937 | South Africa (tour) | 13 | (12) |

Daniël Ferdinand van de Vyver (14 December 1909 – 18 March 1977), nicknamed "Vandie", was a South African rugby union player.

== Playing career ==
Van de Vyver played provincial rugby for the Western Province in the South African Currie Cup competition. He was a member of the 1937 Springbok touring team to Australia and New Zealand and played his first and only test matches for South Africa on 17 July 1937 against the Wallabies at the Sydney Cricket Ground. He also played thirteen tour matches for the Springboks, scoring four tries.

== See also ==
- List of South Africa national rugby union players – Springbok no. 250
