= Worthington Hoskin =

English cricketer

Personal information
- Born: 8 May 1885; Cape Colony
- Died: 4 March 1956 (aged 70); East London, Cape Province, South Africa
- Batting: Right-handed

Domestic team information
- Years: Team
- 1907-1912: Gloucestershire
- Source: Cricinfo, 29 March 2014

Worthington Hoskin (8 May 1885 – 4 March 1956) was an English cricketer. He played for Gloucestershire between 1907 and 1912. He attended St. Andrew's College, Grahamstown, South Africa and was awarded a Rhodes Scholarship in 1904.
