= Clem Currie =

South African rugby union player (1880–1937)

- Born: Clement Currie; 21 October 1880 Grahamstown, Cape Colony
- Died: 12 October 1937 (aged 56)
- School: St Andrews College

Rugby union career
- Position: Forward
Provincial / State sides
| Years | Team | Apps | (Points) |
- Griquas
International career
| Years | Team | Apps | (Points) |
| 1903 | South Africa | 1 | (0) |
- Correct as of 3 June 2019

Clem Currie (21 October 1880 – 12 October 1937) was a Cape Colony international rugby union player who played as a forward.

He made 1 appearance for Cape Colony in 1903.
