= St. Andrew's Preparatory School =

Coordinates: 33.30659°S 26.51247°E

St Andrew's Preparatory School

Location
- Leicester Street; Grahamstown; Eastern Cape 6140; South Africa

Information
- Type: Private, Boarding
- Established: 1885
- Locale: Rural
- Headmaster: Jakes Fredericks
- Deputy Headmaster: Marc Paul
- Grades: 000–7
- Enrollment: 260
- Colors: Royal Blue, Shield Blue
- Website: www.saprepschool.com

St. Andrew's Preparatory School is a private, co-educational boarding school in Makhanda (Grahamstown), Eastern Cape, South Africa.

== History ==
The school was founded in 1885 and has an Anglican foundation.

== A Family of schools ==
St. Andrew's Prep shares close ties with its brother school, St. Andrew's College, a high school for boys and its sister school, the Diocesan School for Girls (DSG); both are located in Grahamstown.

The school has boys and girls from the pre-primary level (Grade 000) to Grade 3, thereafter the girls move to DSG and boys only from Grade 4 to Grade 7.

== Notable alumni ==
Ian Roberts – actor
Sharlto Copley – actor
William Smith (teacher) – Television mathematics & science teacher
