= Kim Bailie =

South-African born American rocketry expert (1929–2008)

- Born: 2 February 1929; Johannesburg
- Died: 29 August 2008 (aged 79); California

John Alexander Hope (Kim) Bailie (1929-2008) was a world authority on the structural dynamics of submarine-launched ballistic rockets.

== Early life ==
Bailie was born in Johannesburg on 2 February 1929, he grew up in Bathurst, Eastern Cape and went to St. Andrew's College, Grahamstown and was in Armstrong House from 1943 to 1946). In 1947 he left South Africa and joined the de Havilland Aeronautical Technical School as an apprentice in aeronautical engineering.

His later qualifications included an M.Sc. in aircraft structures from Cranfield University, a M.S. in engineering mechanics and a PhD in aeronautics and astronautics, both from Stanford University. He was also a CEng and a fellow of the Royal Aeronautical Society.

His outstanding achievements in his field included the structures of the Trident and Polaris ballistic missiles.

In retirement he helped to restore vintage aircraft at the Hiller Aviation Museum near Palo Alto, He also built houses for Habitat for Humanity.
