= J. L. B. Smith =

South African ichthyologist

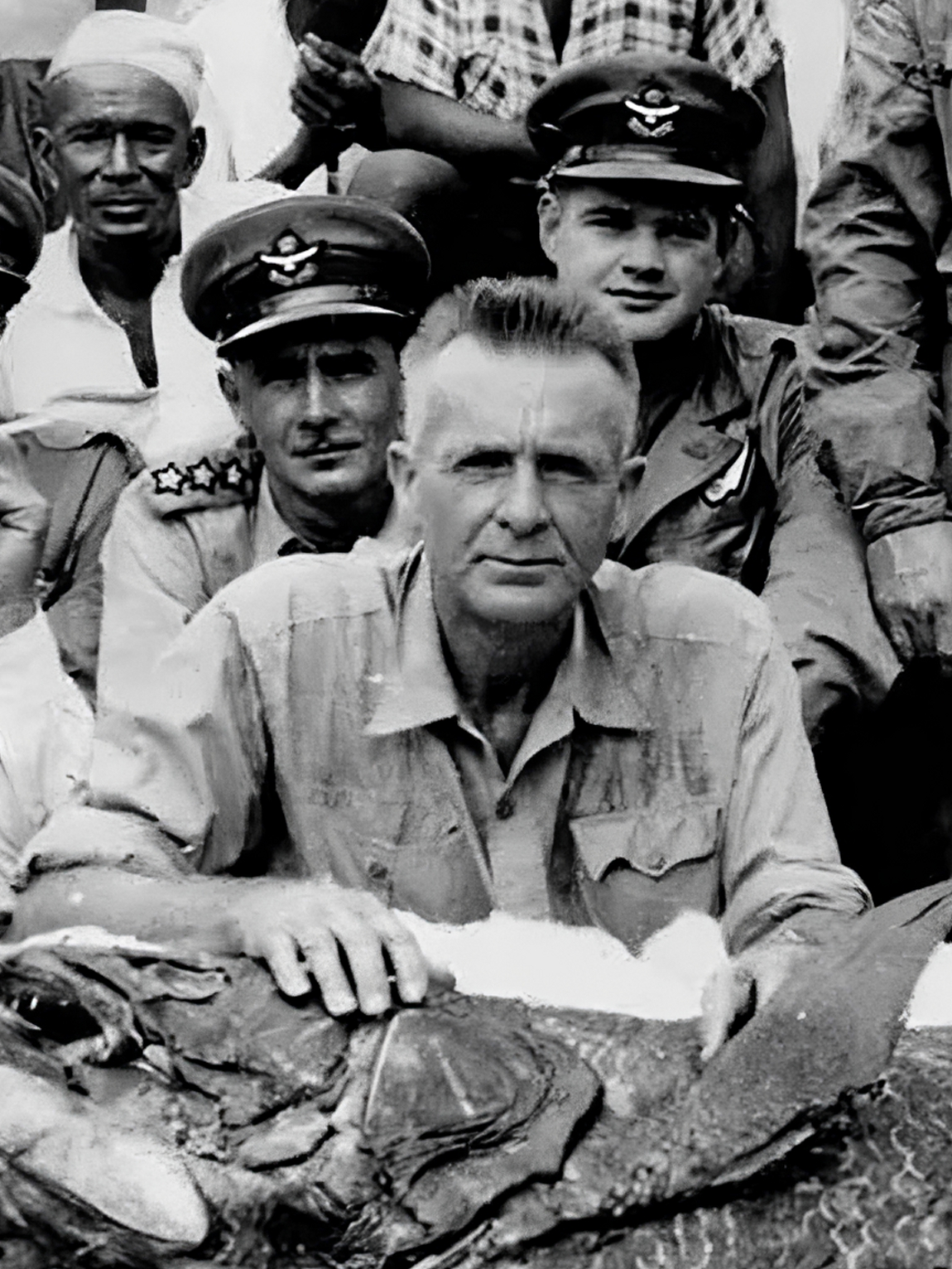
- The second coelacanth ever caught in 1952, with J.L.B. Smith, surrounded with the crew and airmen who flew Smith to the Comoros on order by prime minister D.F. Malan. Image reprinted in Mail & Guardian. Location: South Africa.
- Born: James Leonard Brierley Smith; 26 September 1897; Graaff-Reinet, Cape Colony
- Died: 8 January 1968 (aged 70); Grahamstown, South Africa
- Education: Diocesan College: University of the Cape of Good Hope; Stellenbosch University; University of Cambridge
- Known for: Coelacanth
- Spouse: Margaret Mary Smith
- Children: William Smith
- Scientific career
- Fields: Ichthyologist
- Institutions: Rhodes University
- Author abbrev. (zoology): J.L.B. Smith

James Leonard Brierley Smith (26 September 1897 – 8 January 1968) was a South African ichthyologist, organic chemist, and university professor. He was the first to identify a taxidermied fish as a coelacanth, at the time thought to be long extinct.

== Early life ==
Born in Graaff-Reinet, 26 September 1897, Smith was the elder of two sons of Joseph Smith and his wife, Emily Ann Beck. Educated at country schools at Noupoort, De Aar, and Aliwal North, he finally matriculated in 1914 from the Diocesan College, Rondebosch. He obtained a Bachelor of Arts degree in chemistry from the University of the Cape of Good Hope in 1916 and a Master of Science degree in chemistry at Stellenbosch University in 1918. Smith went to the United Kingdom, where he received his PhD at Cambridge University in 1922. After returning to South Africa, he became senior lecturer and later an associate professor of organic chemistry at Rhodes University in Grahamstown.

From 1922 to 1937, he was married to Henrietta Cecile Pienaar, who was a descendant of Andrew Murray, and whose father was a minister of the NG Kerk at Somerset West. Three children resulted from the marriage.

In Grahamstown, he met Margaret Mary Macdonald, born at Indwe in the Eastern Cape on 26 September 1916. After her school education, she studied at Rhodes University, where she obtained a Bachelor of Science degree in physics and chemistry. She had intended to study medicine, but in 1938, married Smith and became his assistant in the Department of Ichthyology at the university.

His interest in ichthyology was sparked in childhood during a vacation in Knysna.

== Discovery of the coelacanth ==
In 1938, Smith was informed of the discovery of an unusual and unidentified fish by Marjorie Courtenay-Latimer, curator of the East London Museum. When he arrived in East London in February 1939, he was able to identify it immediately as a coelacanth, which was then thought to have been extinct for over 65 million years, and he named the species Latimeria after her. In December 1952, Professor Smith acquired another specimen which had been caught by a fisherman named Ahmed Houssein off the Comoros Islands. Local trader Eric Hunt had cabled Smith, who then persuaded the South African government to fly him in a SAAF Dakota to collect the preserved fish for study at Grahamstown.

Smith and his wife Margaret worked jointly on the popular Sea Fishes of Southern Africa, which was first published in 1949, followed by other writings until 1968. Among these were over 500 papers on fishes and the naming of some 370 new fish species.

== Death and legacy ==
Smith killed himself on 8 January 1968 by cyanide poisoning after many years of struggle with cancer. In the same year, Rhodes University established the J. L. B. Smith Institute of Ichthyology in his memory and to honour his lifetime achievements in ichthyology. His widow, Prof. Margaret Smith, who had worked with her husband for 30 years, was appointed the first director, with a staff of five. Margaret Smith embarked on a recruitment drive to attract ichthyologists and to train African ichthyologists. In 1977, the large, three-storey building, which was designed and constructed in Somerset Street to house the institute, was officially opened. This is now the South African Institute for Aquatic Biodiversity in Grahamstown. Smith's son was renowned South African television science and mathematics teacher William Smith.

== Taxon named in his honour ==
- Meiacanthus smithi, the disco blenny, is named for him.
- Omobranchus smithi (Rao, 1974) is a species of combtooth blenny named for him.

== Taxa described by him ==
- See Category:Taxa named by J. L. B. Smith
