= Vere Stent =

Vere Palgrave Stent (1872-1941) Journalist and war correspondent, theatre critic, playwright and author

== Early life ==
Born in Queenstown, Cape Colony in 1872, Vere was the son of the architect Sydney Stent, and the brother of the actor Lionel B. Stent. He attended St. Andrew's College, Grahamstown from January 1883 to December 1884.

== War correspondent ==
He initially worked for the De Beers mine, and later became a news correspondent with various newspapers: Stent served in Raaff's Rangers, the Chartered Company's Irregular Forces 1893 as Sub-Lieutenant promoted Lieutenant and then Captain, November 1893; served with Colonel Gould-Adam's column entering Matabeleland from south, representing the Transvaal Advertiser; he resigned his commission on conclusion of the war, In December 1893 he was correspondent to the Press, Pretoria, and on General Joubert's staff through the Malaboch War in 1894, also correspondent with General Schalk Burgher through the Low Country Campaign of 1894. Stent the accompanied West Coast fleet under Admiral Rawson to Cape Coast Castle in 1895. He represented the South African Telegraph in Ashanti from 1895 to 1896. He was in Matabeleland during Native Rebellion of 1896 representing the Cape Times and Daily Mail. Stent was present at battle of Thaba Amamba and Matoppo Campaign under Gen. Plumer; he accompanied Cecil Rhodes to the Great Indaba with Rebels, and was mentioned in despatches by Gen. Carrington. In 1897 he represented the Diamond Fields Advertiser at the Langberg Rebellion, Bechuanaland and was present at the storming of the kopje and the death of Luka Jantje, the leader of the rebellion. Stent represented the Reuters News Agency during the Siege of Mafeking from 1899 to 1900; In 1900 he accompanied the 11th Division under Gen. Pole-Carew to Komati Poort. He was later appointed to the writing staff of the Leader newspaper. In 1903 he acquired and became editor of the Pretoria News. He remained editor until 1920.

== Theatre critic ==
Stent was also known as an art, theatre and literature critic.

== Publications ==
As a playwright he wrote one play, entitled War and a Woman, which was produced in Pretoria in 1912. Besides many articles and reviews, his best known publications include Short South African Stories (1909, compiled with his sister, Joan) and A Personal Record of Some Incidents in the Life of Cecil Rhodes. Books of Rhodesia. 1925.. His own life is the subject of a biography by his daughters.

== General references ==
- Laurie, K. W. J. (1914). Register of S. Andrew's College, Grahamstown, from 1855 to 1914. Grahamstown: Slater & Co.
- Stent, Sally; Stent, Betty (1972). The Forthright Man. Howard Timmins. ISBN 978-0-86978-032-9.
- Morrison, Heidi (2012). The Global History of Childhood Reader. Routledge. ISBN 978-0-415-78248-7.
- MacDonald, Robert H. (1994). The Language of Empire: Myths and Metaphors of Popular Imperialism, 1880-1918. Manchester University Press. ISBN 978-0-7190-3749-8.
- Sykes, Frank W.; Löwinger, C. G. (1897). With Plumer in Matabeleland: An Account of the Operations of the Matabeleland Relief Force During the Rebellion of 1896. Westminster: A. Constable & Company.
- Perrett, Bryan (2012). Against All Odds!. Orion. ISBN 978-1-78022-520-3.
