= George Edward Cotterill =

English cricketer

George Edward Cotterill (28 July 1839 – 2 June 1913) was an English cricketer active from 1858 to 1874 who played for Cambridge Town Club (aka Cambridgeshire), Sussex and Cambridge University. He was born at Weilghery Hills, Madras and died in Cambridge. He appeared in 18 matches as a righthanded batsman and occasional wicketkeeper who bowled underarm. He scored 447 runs with a highest score of 55 and held five catches with two stumpings. He took 14 wickets with a best analysis of five for 23.

Cotterill was educated at Brighton College and St John's College, Cambridge. He was made a deacon in Grahamstown, South Africa in 1863 and ordained as a priest in 1864 by his father, the Rt Revd Henry Cotterill, the bishop of Grahamstown at the time.

His brother Joseph Cotterill played 37 matches, mainly for Sussex, from 1870 to 1888. Cotterill's son was George Huth Cotterill, who also played for Cambridge University and Sussex.

Cotterill had an academic career and was successively Headmaster of St. Andrew's College, Grahamstown (1862–65); Assistant Master at Brighton College (1865–81); Headmaster of St Bernard's, Woking (1881–87); Headmaster of Weybridge School (1887–95); and Rector at Idlicote, Warwickshire (1896–1911).
