= Margaret Mary Smith =

British ichthyologist and illustrator

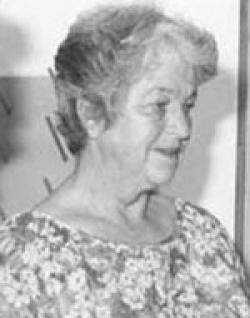
- Born: Margaret Mary MacDonald; 26 September 1916; Indwe, Cape Province
- Died: 8 September 1987 (aged 70)
- Education: Rhodes University
- Spouse: J. L. B. Smith
- Children: William Smith
- Scientific career
- Fields: Ichthyologist
- Institutions: Rhodes University

Margaret Mary Smith (née MacDonald; 26 September 1916 in Indwe, Cape Province, South Africa – 8 September 1987), was an ichthyologist, accomplished fish illustrator, and an academic.

== Early life ==
Margaret Mary Smith was the daughter of Chisholm MacDonald and Helen Evelyn Zondagh. Her father was a medical doctor and her mother a descendant of the Voortrekker leader Jacobus Johannes Uys. She was the youngest of three children.

Margaret attended Indwe High School. She was head girl and head scholar as well as chairperson of the debating society and captain of the netball and tennis teams. From 1934 to 1936 she attended Rhodes University, where she achieved a Bachelor of Science degree majoring in physics and chemistry. She also attended the Grahamstown Training College School of Music and obtained her University Teachers' Licentiate in Music for singing in 1936.

== Career ==
In 1937, after she obtained her degree, she was hired as a senior demonstrator in chemistry at Rhodes University. She tutored students in physics and chemistry and in 1945 she taught physics at St. Andrew’s College. On 14 April 1937 Margaret married her chemistry lecturer James Leonard Brierley Smith in Florida, Transvaal. They had one son named William. He is the renowned South African television science and mathematics teacher William Smith.

Besides physics and chemistry, Margaret had an interest in ichthyology, the study of fish. During 1938 and 1956, Margaret Mary Smith and her husband conducted fish collection expeditions along the South African coast. In 1952, they found a rare coelacanth in the Comoros, only the second live specimen positively identified in modern history. The first specimen had been discovered in 1938 by a colleague of James named Marjorie Courtenay-Latimer. Margaret made the illustrations and paintings for their manuscript.

In 1946, the Department of Ichthyology was opened at Rhodes University. Both Margaret and her husband worked in the department and worked on the production of a book called "The Sea Fishes of Southern Africa", which was published in 1945. Margaret, produced 685 paintings for the first edition of the book. She produced over 2000 paintings of fish and became recognised as one of the leading fish illustrators in the world.

As well as being a co-author, Margaret produced many colour figures, and one of her first major solo works was the description and illustration of the common marine fishes of South Africa in the 16-volume set of "Ensiklopedie van die Wêreld".

She also illustrated the fishes in the later editions of Sea Fishes of Southern Africa, Fishes of the Seychelles and Fishes of the Tsitsikama Coastal National Park.

In January 1968, her husband died. According to those who knew him, he had said years earlier that he had no intention of living past 70. He took his own life by cyanide poisoning. The couple jointly discovered 370 species of fish and published 500 papers. Between 1968 and 1982 Margaret Mary Smith was the director of the J.L.B. Smith Institute of Ichthyology. The Institute was established to commemorate her husband James Leonard Brierley Smith and continue his work. Margaret spent seven months visiting ichthyological research institutes and museums in Europe, North America, the Far East and Australasia to gather ideas for the design of an ichthyological research unit in Grahamstown. The building was officially opened on 26 September 1977, the date of both her and her late husband’s birthdays. The research unit promoted, among other things, coelacanth research.

She was a part of a team that established the new Department of Ichthyology and Fisheries Science at Rhodes University. In 1978, along with Phil Heemstra, she co-edited revision of the book she initially wrote with her late husband. In 1980, Margaret was appointed an associate professor and in April 1980 the institute was expanded into a National Museum. In 1981, she was appointed a full professor.

The institute was a declared cultural institution in 1981. It was financed by the then Department of National Education.

On 30 April 1982 Margaret Smith retired as director of the J.L.B. Smith Institute. She had served on the Senate and Faculty of Science of the University from 1968 to 1982. She left behind the largest collection of southern African marine fishes in the world. While retired, Margaret Smith received the Order for Meritorious Service, Class 1 (Gold) in 1987 from the state President, P. W. Botha.

The Margaret Smith Library is named in honour of the first Director of the JLB Smith Institute of Ichthyology, now the South African Institute for Aquatic Biodiversity (SAIAB) at Rhodes University. Built in 2001, The Margaret Smith Residence, a women’s hostel at Rhodes University honours her contribution to the university and to international science.

== See also ==
- Category:Taxa named by Margaret Mary Smith
- Coelacanth
- James Leonard Brierley Smith
- West Indian Ocean coelacanth
