= Purdon =

Purdon may refer to:

- Purdon, Texas, an unincorporated community in Navarro County, Texas in the United States.

Purdon may also refer to the following people:

- Bartholomew Purdon (1675–1737), Irish landowner and politician
- Charles Purdon (1838–1926), South African fruit farmer
- Corran Purdon (1921–2018), Irish-born British soldier
- Frank Purdon, Ireland rugby union international
- Henry Purdon (1687–1737), Irish barrister, politician, and law officer
- Jack Purdon (1930–2007), Australian rules footballer
- Jock Purdon (1925–1998), Scottish poet and songwriter
- Katherine Purdon (1852–1920), Irish writer
- Mark Purdon, New Zealand driver and trainer of standardbred racehorses
- Michael Purdon, Scottish lawn bowler
- Patrick Purdon, American biomedical engineer
- Roy Purdon (1927–2022), New Zealand harness-racing trainer
- Stephen Purdon (born 1983), Scottish actor
- Ted Purdon (1930–2007), South African professional footballer
- Tim Purdon, former United States Attorney for the District of North Dakota
- Major-General William Purdon (1881–1950), Irish soldier, medical administrator and international rugby player
