= Thomas Shone =

1820 South African Settler

Thomas Shone (6 August 1784 London, Great Britain – 20 February 1868 Kidd's Beach, South Africa) was an 1820 Settler and diarist in the Cape Colony.

Thomas was born in Westminster, London on the 6 August 1784 to Thomas Shone, a wine merchant, and Mary Beck. His father's roots lay in Cheshire, while his mother was from London. He was baptised on the 29 August 1784 at All Hallows Staining. Thomas went to sea at approximately 18 and while on board the second voyage of the Lord Nelson, was captured by the French on 14 August 1803. He was imprisoned in Givet and Sarrelivre prison camps, where he learnt his trade of shoe-making. Thomas Shone was not a member of the Royal Navy, but an Ordinary Seaman, joining the East India Company in 1802. (Note: As per ships' documents and French POW records.)

With the aid of French Freemasons, he escaped to England where he started a family in London. In 1820 his three children were Wesleyan, baptised soon before boarding Nautilus with his wife Sarah Phillips, and sailed to Algoa Bay. He had joined a party as a labourer, despite his ability to read and write. As part of the Scott party, which meant he was bound to work at his master's command for five years to repay the cost of his voyage, they were settled close to the Xhosa border and were the last to leave after the first Xhosa war broke out, losing all their belongings. He built up a second farm which was again burnt down in a later border war. On the death of his wife Sarah in 1837, he became melancholic and decided to write a daily journal, which he continued for 30 years. The journal provides insight into the day-to-day lives of the 1820 Settlers. (Note: The original journal is located at the Cory Library at Rhodes University)

His grandson, Thomas Leopold Hamilton Shone, founded the manganese mining industry in South Africa; another of his grandsons, Edward Clement Roberts of Roberts Victor Diamond Mine renown, was the first man to mine anthracite in the Maclear district of South Africa.

== Note & References ==
- Shone, Thomas (1992) [1838-1859]. Silva, Penelope (ed.). The Albany Journals of Thomas Shone. Volume 12 of Graham's Town Series. Cape Town: Maskew Miller Longman. ISBN 9780636016071.
- Shone, Dudley K. (1994). Shones of South Africa. Dudley K. Shone and Lorna Shone.
