= Ivan Mitford-Barberton =

South African sculptor (1896–1976)

- Born: 1 February 1896; Somerset East, Cape Colony
- Died: 9 June 1976 (aged 80); Hout Bay, Cape Town
- Occupations: Sculptor and writer
- Notable work: The Mutual Building, Red Cross War Memorial Children's Hospital

Ivan Mitford-Barberton (1896–1976) was a South African sculptor, writer and authority on heraldry.

== Early life and education ==
Mitford-Barberton was born in Somerset East, in Cape Colony, in 1896. He was a descendant of several 1820 Settler families. His grandmother was the naturalist, Mary Elizabeth Barber. He did his schooling at St. Andrew's College, Grahamstown. (Note: Ivan Mitford-Barberton is listed as Barber, Ivan Gray in the Register of S. Andrew's College, Grahamstown, from 1855 to 1914 (Laurie 1914, p. 62)) In 1912 his family moved to Kenya, where he encountered African and Arab subjects that later formed an important theme in his work. From 1915 to 1918 he served as a soldier in East Africa. From 1919 to 1922 he studied at the Grahamstown School of Art, and from 1923 at the Royal College of Art in London, under Henry Moore and Derwent Wood. He returned to Kenya in 1927 and set up a studio there. Mitford-Barberton was an active member of the South African Society of Arts and taught art at the Michaelis School of Fine Art in Cape Town.

== Works ==
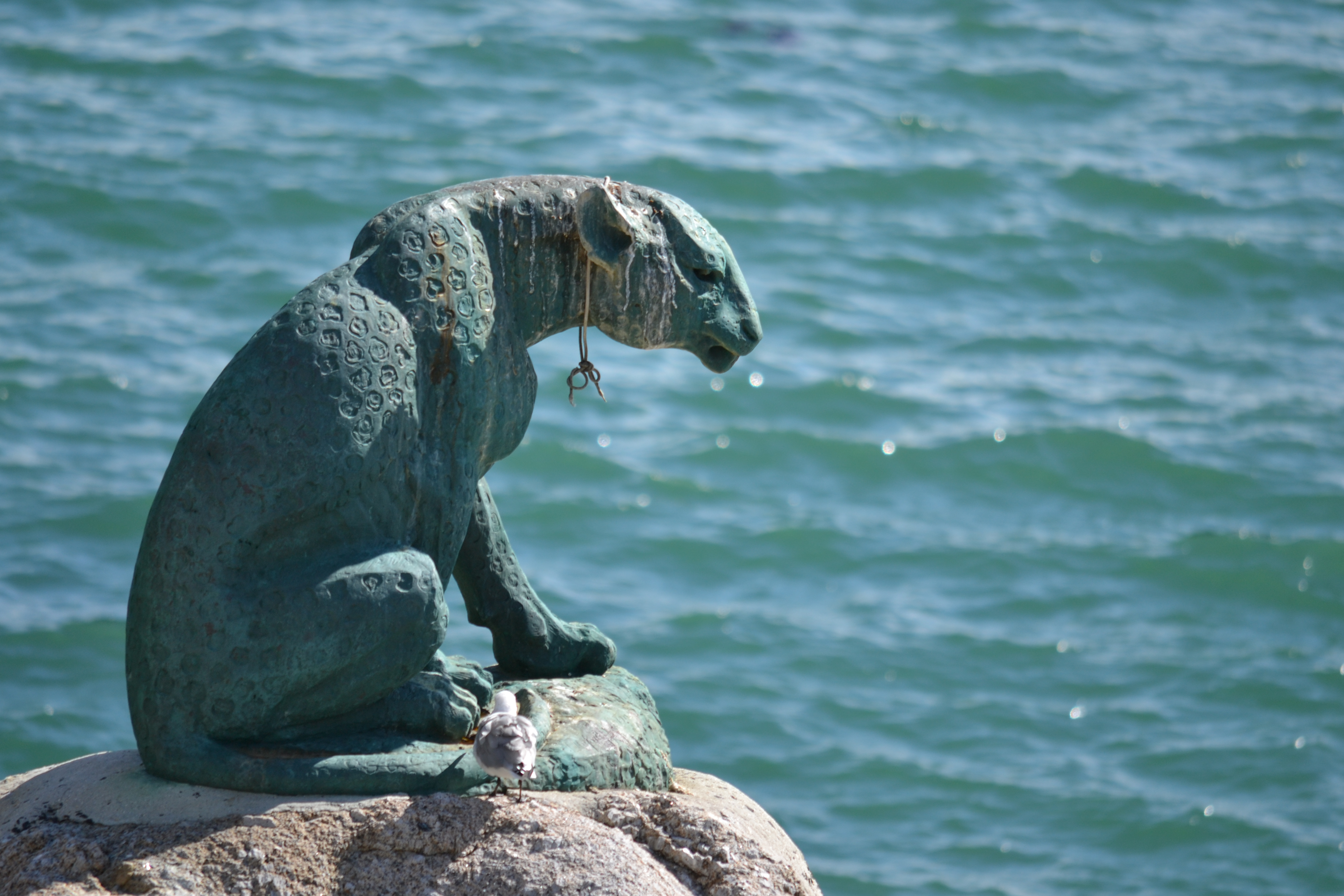
Leopard Memorial, Hout Bay

He designed the monument of Jock of the Bushveld in Barberton, a place that was co-founded by his ancestors. The bronze statue of a leopard in Hout Bay, where he lived, is his work. The sculpture of Peter Pan at the Red Cross Children's Hospital in Cape Town was done by Mitford-Barberton

In the 1930s he designed parts of the exterior and the interior decoration of Mutual Building, in Cape Town, the then highest building in Africa 91 metres (299 ft) (excluding the Pyramids of Giza). The exterior is equipped with a 120-metre (390 ft) granite frieze and with nine 4-metre-high (13 ft) figures.

Mitford-Barberton designed the stucco reliefs that were placed in the pediments of the neo-baroque public buildings of Tongaat and Maidstone in Kwa-Zulu Natal. These reliefs were an emulation of the eighteenth-century work in the Cape of the noted sculptor Anton Anreith and his colleague, the architect Louis Thibault. Where Anreith and Thibault modelled Palladian figures drawn from classical mythology, Mitford-Barberton designed groupings of plantation workers, and allusions to the Saunders family, founders of the Tongaat Sugar Company. Mitford-Barberton also undertook freestanding sculptures for public spaces and garden features on the Tongaat estate.

Miford-Barberton created the sculpture of the Settler family at the 1820 Settlers National Monument in Grahamstown.

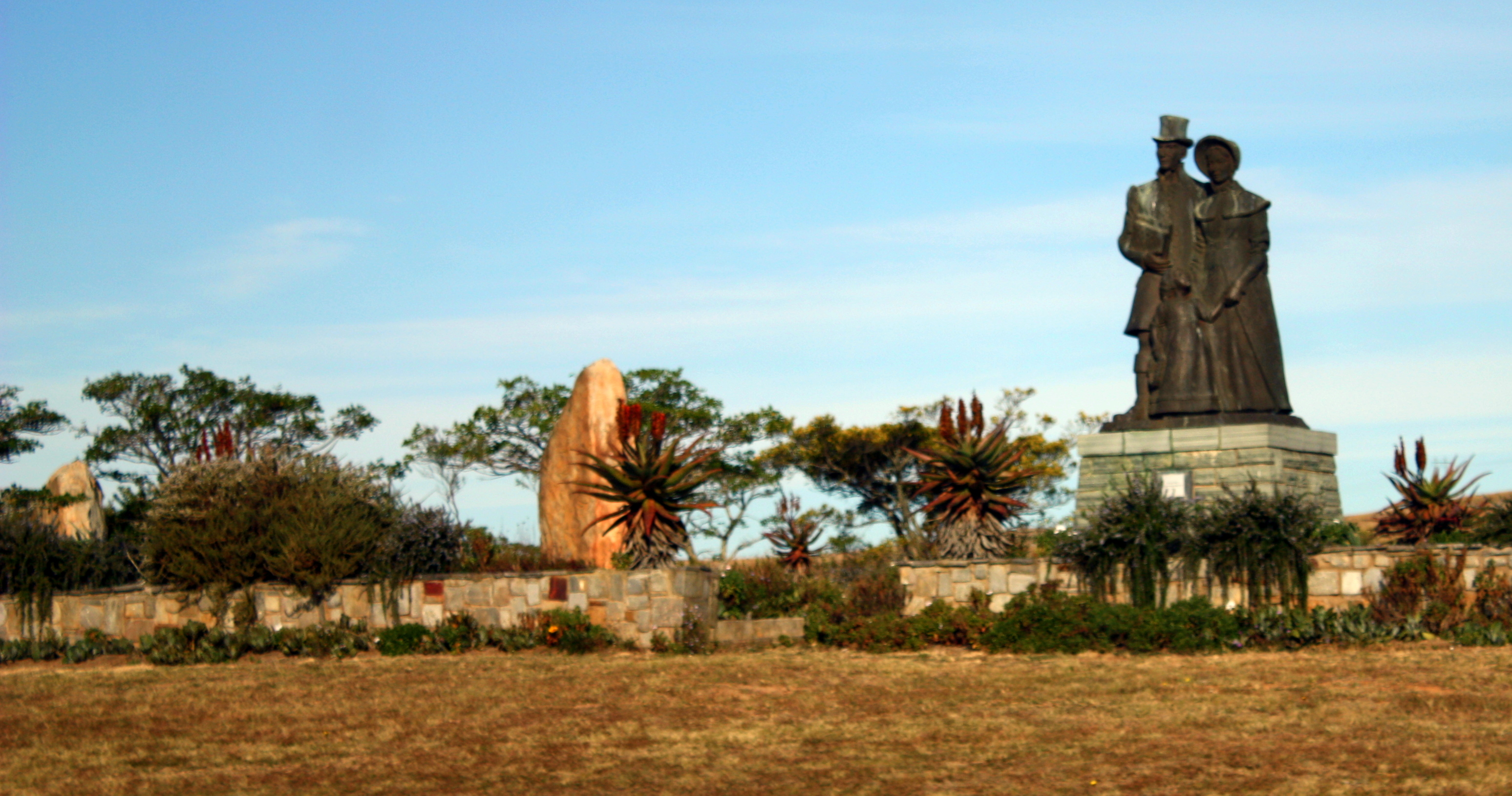
Statue of a Settler family at the 1820 Settlers National Monument

From 1947 to 1961, Mitford-Barberton was a member of the Royal Society of British Sculptors, 1957-1961 a Fellow of the Society and a member of the Theosophical Lodge Cape Town.

Mitford-Barberton was a prominent figure in the field of heraldry. In 1947, the Cape Provincial Administration commissioned him to prepare a display of municipal coats of arms for the visit of King George VI. Shortly afterwards, the administration asked municipalities to have their arms checked, and if necessary, re-designed, by Mitford-Barberton, to improve heraldic quality. As a result, he designed dozens of municipal coats of arms, some of them in collaboration with H. Ellis Tomlinson (in England). In 1956, he addressed the Institute of Town Clerks of Southern Africa on the subject.

He was a founder member of the Heraldry Society of Southern Africa in 1953. He was a member of the Heraldry Council from 1963 to 1972.

Ivan Mitford-Barberton wrote several books on the history of his family and the 1820 Settlers. He was married twice and had five children, three sons and two daughters.

== Publications ==
- Ivan Mitford-Barberton, sculptor. Bailey Bros. & Swinfen. 1962.
- Some frontier families: biographical sketches of 100 Eastern Province families before 1840. Human and Rousseau. 1969. with Violet White
- Comdt. Holden Bowker. Human & Rousseau. 1970.
- Barbers of the Peak: A History of the Barber, Atherstone, and Bowker Families. University Press. 1934.

== Notes and references ==
- Laurie, K. W. J. (1914). Register of S. Andrew's College, Grahamstown, from 1855 to 1914. Grahamstown: Slater & Co.
- Governor of Kenya (26 September 1923). Kenya Gazette.
- Afọlayan, Funso S. (2004). Culture and Customs of South Africa. Greenwood. ISBN 978-0-313-32018-7.
- Merrington, Peter (December 2006). "Cape Dutch Tongaat: A Case Study in 'Heritage'". Journal of Southern African Studies. 32 (4, Heritage in Southern Africa). Taylor & Francis: 683–699. doi:10.1080/03057070600995426. JSTOR 25065145. S2CID 144785763.(subscription required)
- Buckland, Richard; Neville, Thelma (2004). A story of Rhodes: Rhodes University 1904 to 2004. Macmillan. ISBN 978-0-7978-2402-7.

=== Further reading ===
- Hilton-Barber, David (2014). The Saint, the Surgeon and the Unsung Botanist: A tribute to my remarkable ancestors. Footprints Press. ISBN 978-0-620-61401-6.
