= Mary Elizabeth Barber =

British naturalist, biologist

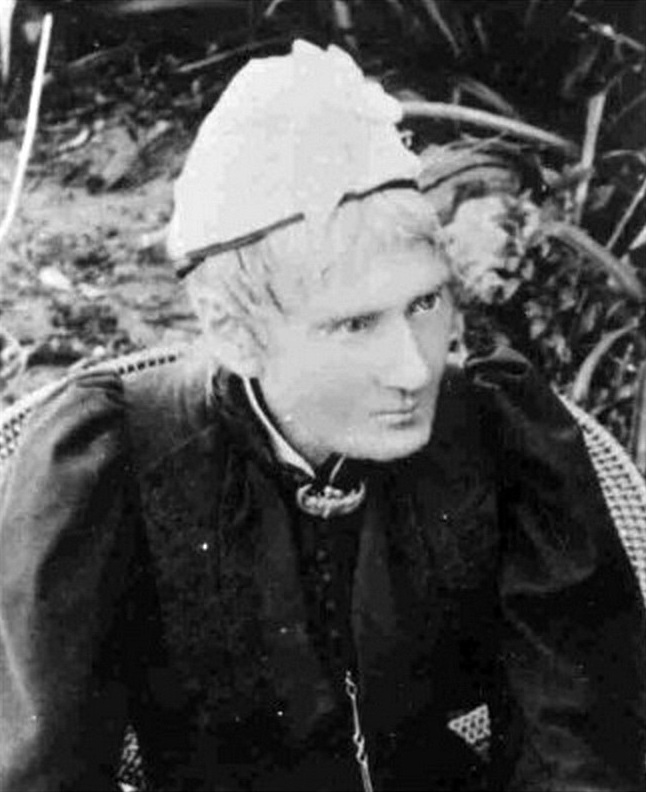
- Born: 5 January 1818; South Newton, Wiltshire, England
- Died: 4 September 1899 (aged 81); Pietermaritzburg, Colony of Natal
- Spouse: Frederick William Barber
- Scientific career
- Fields: Botany; ornithology; entomology

Mary Elizabeth Barber (5 January 1818 – 4 September 1899) was a pioneering British-born amateur scientist of the nineteenth century. Without formal education, she made a name for herself in botany, ornithology and entomology. She was also an accomplished poet and painter, and illustrated her scientific contributions that were published by learned societies such as the Royal Entomological Society in London, the Royal Botanical Gardens in Kew, and the Linnean Society of London.

== Early life ==
Barber was born Mary Elizabeth Bowker in South Newton, Wiltshire, on 5 January 1818. She was the ninth of eleven children and first daughter of Miles and Anna Maria Bowker of Gateshead, Northumberland. Her father was a moderately wealthy sheep farmer, owning his own wool-processing business. In 1820 he moved his family to Cape Colony, South Africa along with other British settlers who wished to take advantage of the South African government's offer of 100 acres of land for every man over the age of 18. The Bowker family received land in Albany, near Grahamstown. Here Bowker set up a school for his children and those of this workers, and his affinity for natural history heavily influenced the lessons the children received.

Mary and her brothers all shared a love of natural history, but it was the 1838 publication of the book The genera of South African plants, arranged according to the Natural System by Irish botanist William Henry Harvey that changed her life. She was fascinated by the chapters on the structure of plants and the Linnean classification system, and responded to the author's request for specimens so that he could begin documenting the flora of the Cape. Her ongoing correspondence with Harvey took place during a time when it was not generally accepted for women to engage in scientific discussion; indeed, in the beginning she did not disclose the fact that she was a woman. She enjoyed unprecedented freedom in this respect, partly because she was released from the relatively constraining Victorian culture of her home country, but also because of her father's encouragement and the generally relaxed pre-Victorian (Georgian) ideals he carried from an era when women enjoyed a freer voice. She became one of Harvey's main suppliers of plants from South Africa and also assisted him in the naming and classification of numerous species. Over a nearly 30-year correspondence, she sent Harvey approximately 1,000 species with notes on each one. She also established a correspondence with British botanist Joseph Dalton Hooker.

In 1842 she married Frederick William Barber, an analytical chemist who had established a farm in South Africa. They had two sons and a daughter. Barber was the grandmother of the sculptor, Ivan Mitford-Barberton

== Contributions to science ==
=== Botany ===
Barber made substantial contributions to botanical science of the era through her collections and scientific observations of South African flora and fauna. This resulted in several plant species being named after her. She and her younger brother, naturalist James Henry Bowker, sent many previously unknown species of plants to the herbarium at Trinity College Dublin, and the Royal Botanic Gardens in Kew.

Aloidendron barberae (tree aloe) was first discovered by Barber, who was collecting plants in the former Transkei of South Africa. She sent specimens of the plant and its flowers to the Royal Botanic Gardens at Kew, where in 1874 the specific epithet was given by William Turner Thiselton-Dyer (1843–1928) in her honor. In addition, she discovered Lotononis harveyi (Mrs. Barber's beauty), which was named after her.

=== Entomology ===
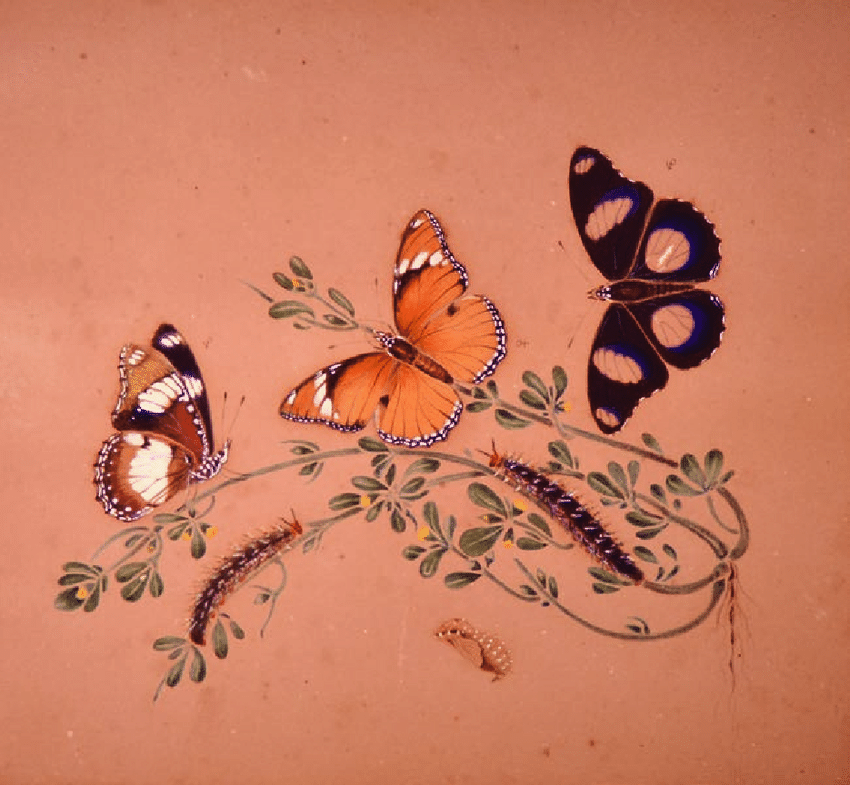
Diadema misippus = Hypolimnas misippus by Barber

Barber developed an interest in entomology while her husband was engaged in the ongoing guerilla warfare between the settlers and native Africans. With her brother, James Henry Bowker, she began documenting African moths and butterflies, and contacted entomologist Roland Trimen (1840–1916) in 1863 to share her discoveries. Her observations are reported to have contributed to Charles Darwin's deliberations on the role of moths in orchid pollination. Barber was introduced to Charles Darwin by Roland Trimen, a fellow British entomologist in South Africa in 1863. Barber exchanged letters and observations with Darwin and other gentlemen-naturalists in his scientific network. Her influence on Darwin's work was communicated indirectly, via Trimen. In 1865, Mary had declared she would write to Darwin herself about "the locusts and the locust birds", but there is no record of this, despite Darwin himself being a meticulous archiver of his correspondence. In other letters, Barber seemed to concur with Darwin's theory of natural selection, citing the dominance of European settlers in Cape Colony as proof.

=== Scientific societies ===
Barber's contributions to science were eventually rewarded in 1878 with an invitation to become a member of the South African Philosophical Society – a singular honour at the time. The Linnean Society in London did not welcome women as members until 1905, emphasizing the progressive nature of this South African society, and the impact that Barber had had on her discipline. Her reply to this invitation sums up the attitudes of the time:

"I have no objection....and I don't see any reason why a Lady should in a quiet way be a member of any scientific society... I do not by any means approve of ladies coming publicly forward and usurping the places of men by preaching, making speeches, etc., but I don't see why they should not belong to any society that they are qualified for, and in a quiet way enjoy the privileges too."

Barber joined the South African Philosophical Society on 26 June 1878. Her paper on the peculiar colours of animals in relation to their habits of life was published later that year. This paper was written in response to an article by Alfred Russel Wallace in which he debated Darwin's theory on female choice in sexual selection. Barber fully appreciated (and had the observations to prove) that females choose males based on their phenotypes: showy courtships, glossy plumage.

She went on to become the first female member of the Ornithologischer Verein in Vienna, the main ornithological society in Austria, and several papers of hers were translated into Hungarian.

== Other activities ==
In the 1850s Barber assisted her older brother, Thomas Holden Bowker, in his work amassing the first collection of Stone Age implements in South Africa. In the 1870s Barber wrote a collection of articles about the discovery of diamonds and gold in South Africa. She also illustrated scenes from the diamond fields in several paintings.

== Later life ==
Barber finally came into enough money to fund a visit to Europe in 1889, where she toured the Royal Botanic Gardens at Kew for the first time, as well as visited scientific friends around Europe. She died in Pietermaritzburg, in 1899.
