= Eusebius McKaiser =

South African political analyst, journalist and broadcaster (1978–2023)

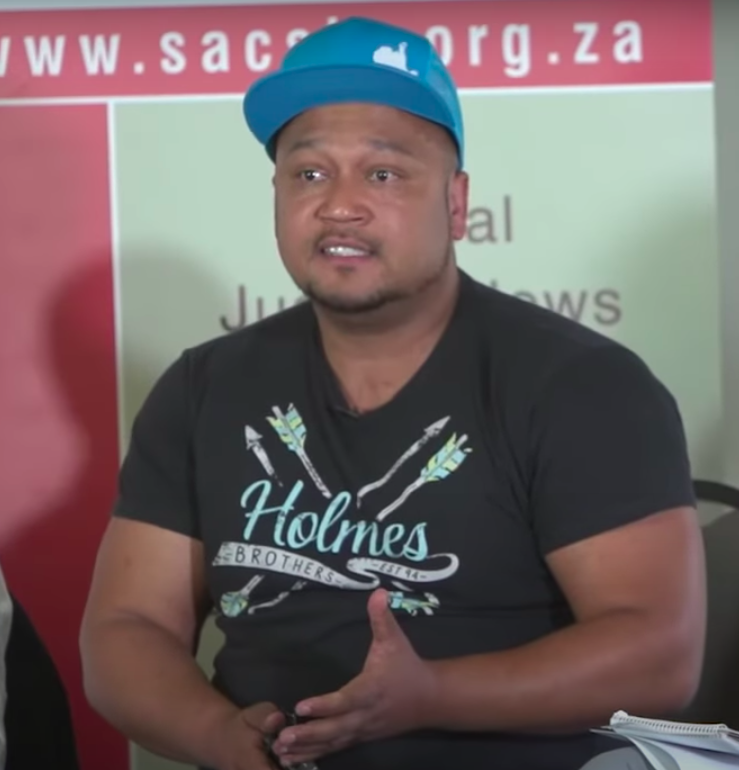
- McKaiser in 2015
- Born: 28 March 1978; Grahamstown, Cape Province, South Africa
- Died: 30 May 2023 (aged 45); Johannesburg, Gauteng, South Africa
- Education: Rhodes University; St Antony's College, Oxford University
- Occupations: Political analyst; journalist; broadcaster; author

Eusebius McKaiser (28 March 1978 – 30 May 2023) was a South African political analyst, journalist, and broadcaster. Among others, he wrote for the Mail & Guardian, the Sunday Times, Foreign Policy, The Guardian, The New York Times, and Business Day, for which he wrote a weekly column. He gained prominence as a Radio 702 talk show host, and also wrote three books about South African politics and society.

== Life and career ==
Eusebius McKaiser was born on 28 March 1978, in Grahamstown, Cape Province, where his working-class family lived in a coloured township. He attended St Mary's Primary School and Graeme College, and matriculated from the latter in 1996. From 1997, he attended Rhodes University, graduating with distinction with a bachelor's degree in law and philosophy, an honours degree, and, in 2003, a master's degree in philosophy, with a thesis on moral objectivity. Between 2005 and 2006, he attended the University of Oxford (St Antony's College) on a Rhodes Scholarship, where he received a BPhil and did doctoral research – never completed – under Ralph Wedgwood and John Broome, also in moral philosophy. He was also an Oppenheimer Memorial Trust Scholar.

McKaiser later worked as an associate consultant at McKinsey & Company, and by 2012 was a political and social analyst at the Wits Centre for Ethics and at the University of Johannesburg Centre for the Study of Democracy. The first radio show he hosted at Radio 702 was a weekly late-night talk show called Politics and Morality. He hosted the SABC 3 current affairs programme Interface until 2011, and later anchored 702's Talk@9 show on week nights.

When Power FM launched on 18 June 2013, he began as host of Power Talk, a three-hour weekday morning talk show. In October 2014, he left Power FM – according to the station, due to insoluble disagreements between him and the station – and returned to Radio 702 in July 2016, taking over from Redi Thlabi with a weekday morning talk slot. According to the Mail & Guardian, through his radio work, McKaiser had "etched himself on the national psyche" by 2013. Pumla Dineo Gqola later said that his morning show on 702, the Eusebius McKaiser Show, "shaped everyday dialogue and, with it, the culture of our time," and compliment McKaiser's "heartbreaking, illuminating and often joyful intellectual work."

McKaiser left Radio 702 in June 2020, because the station had not been prepared to dedicate adequate resources to the production of his show. He then hosted a podcast called In the Ring and, on YouTube, an Exclusive Books show about books called Cover to Cover.

McKaiser died due to a suspected epileptic seizure on 30 May 2023, at age 45.

== Bibliography ==
- McKaiser, Eusebius (2012). A Bantu in My Bathroom!: Debating Race, Sexuality and Other Uncomfortable South African Topics. Bookstorm. ISBN 978-1-920434-66-3.
- McKaiser, Eusebius (2014). Could I Vote DA?: A Voter's Dilemma. Bookstorm. ISBN 978-1-920434-56-4.
- McKaiser, Eusebius (2016). Run Racist Run: Journeys into the Heart of Racism. Bookstorm. ISBN 978-1-928257-16-5.

== Awards ==
- 2010: Mail & Guardian's 200 Young South Africans list
- 2011: World Masters Debate Champion
- 2012: Rhodes University Emerging Old Rhodian Award
