= Charles Purdon =

Charles Purdon (18 March 1838 – 22 July 1926) planted the first pineapples in the Eastern Cape of South Africa in 1865, which led to the commercial pineapple industry in the country.

== Biography ==
Charles Purdon was born on 18 March 1838 in the Albany district of the Cape Colony. He was the son of William Henry Purdon and Eliza Purdon (née Tarr), who had come to the Cape Colony as children with the British 1820 Settlers.

He married Dorothy Cockroft in 1863 and farmed between Grahamstown and Port Alfred. In 1865 he travelled to Grahamstown by ox-wagon; presumably this was a regular visit for supplies. While he was there, he decided to have his hair cut.

He entered the barbershop of Mr. Lindsay Green. While sitting in the barber's chair, he noticed a row of pineapple crowns (tops) set on the brims of jars of water. These having roused his curiosity, Mr. Green informed him that they were from pineapples, sent to him as a gift. The fruit had been brought by ship to Durban by a sailor having returned from Brazil.

== See also ==
- British diaspora in Africa
- 1820 Settlers National Monument
