= Rhodes University Library =

Rhodes University Library Services
- 33°18′50″S 26°31′07″E
- Location: Rhodes University, Grahamstown, South Africa
- Type: Academic library
- Established: 1907
- Branches: 3

Collection
- Items collected: books, journals, newspapers, magazines, sound and music recordings, maps, prints, drawings and manuscripts
- Size: 320 000 physical items, 64 electronic databases, 30 km archival materials

Access and use
- Members: Students, staff and fellows of Rhodes University

Other information
- Director: Nomawethu Danster
- Employees: 49
- Website: www.ru.ac.za/library/

The Rhodes University Library is a library located in Makhanda, under the Makana municipality. It was initially established in 1937 in the Clock Tower building of Rhodes University College.

== Early historical development ==
Background and research acknowledgement: the following historic detail is largely based on the historic account drafted by Sue van der Riet in November 2010. At the stage of drafting the history, Sue was working as a librarian at Rhodes University Library.

Within a couple of years after the founding of Rhodes University in 1904, a library collection was begun. The bulk of the initial library collection consisted of a gift, in 1907, from H.M. Stationery Office of “some hundreds of massive quarto volumes of The Anglo Saxon Chronicle, et hoe genus omne – the famous ‘Rolls Series”. This was followed by a substantial donation from Gill College, in Somerset East, of the material it had collected to prepare students for the examinations of the old University of the Cape of Good Hope.

Initially housed in the Drostdy, in 1917 the library moved to a rudimentary building vacated by the Department of Botany. Although the environment was not considered a conducive area to house a library, the library continued to occupy the premises for the next 20 years.

The end of the Great Depression enabled the university to build the centre portion of the main block, whose upper floor (under the clock tower) was allocated to the library, into which it moved in 1937. The foundation-stone was laid by Jan Hofmeyer, then Minister of Education, and it dutifully records in elegant Latin that once more the Rhodes Trust had contributed generously to the cost of the building”.

By 1955, the library again found itself facing a critical shortage of space. Not only was the book collection growing at the rate of over 4,000 volumes per year, but “accommodation for readers was also proving insufficient and the student enrolment seemed set for a steady increase".

The University Council afforded this predicament high priority, and due to the sound stewardship of its incumbent Vice-Chancellor, Dr Thomas Alty, the university's excellent financial status enabled it to call for tenders for an entirely new library building "on a plan designed to meet the most exacting requirements". This decision was almost certainly influenced by the prospect of the valuable space the library would release once it moved out of the main building as there was a "great shortage of classroom and study accommodation throughout the university".

By the end of March 1958, a site had been identified and purchased. Situated in the heart of the campus, surrounded by residences and academic buildings, it had been "formerly occupied by the Grahamstown Tennis Club, a site agreed by all concerned in planning and building the library as being the ideal one for its new purpose".

Able to accommodate its existing collection of 100,000 books, but with shelving capable of taking double that number, the building would, if filled to capacity, be able to house "perhaps over half a million books". There was seating for 360 readers, with sufficient room to increase this to 500. Declared officially opened on the afternoon of Saturday 8 April 1961 by Lady Schonland, wife of the Chancellor of the University, it was considered one of the finest of its kind in Africa. Together with furniture and equipment, it cost over R200,000.

== Affiliated research libraries ==
=== Amazwi South African Museum of Literature ===
Rhodes University Library housed the Thomas Pringle Collection, which later formed the National English Literary Museum, colloquially known as NELM. Launched in 1972 at the instigation of Professor Guy Butler, Karin de Jager recalls that the "fledgling Thomas Pringle Collection was housed in the only available open space in the Rhodes Library – for unknown reasons dubbed The Priest’s Hole. This was a tiny room, always locked, safeguarding the sorry little Rhodes collection of “banned books". "All too rapidly" wrote Malcolm Hacksley, "the Collection had outgrown its first home and ... it moved from Rhodes University into its present premises in the “Priest’s House” in Beaufort Street." So, in April 1980, rather charmingly, NELM, went from the Priest's Hole to the Priest's House, but retained its links to Rhodes University by becoming an Associated Research Institute of the University.

=== The Cory Library for Historical Research ===
Sir George Cory, in 1931, donated an extensive personal library to the Rhodes University Council, opening the collection for use by the Rhodes community. This collection was, at that time, considered to be the most valuable collection of Africana materials relating to the Eastern Cape. Additional donations received, coupled with physical building challenges, led to Council approving a decision to house the Cory collections in the Eden Grove complex as a separate research facility. The move was completed in 2000.

== Post-2000 Developments ==
Various developments in the 1990s led to the realisation that the current library building was insufficient to address the needs of the campus community and the ever-increasing collections. After two-and-a-half years of research, consultation and planning, the Rhodes University Council approved plans the expand the library building. Estimated to cost R90 million, Rhodes University was able to allocate R50 million of an R80-million re-capitalisation grant made to the University by the Department of Education.

The development team was tasked with raising the remaining R40 million and a major fundraising programme was initiated. On 22 September 2008, the ceremony marking the turning of the first sod took place and building was underway. On Thursday 4 November 2010, the new and expanded Rhodes University Library was officially opened by the Minister of Higher Education, Dr Blade Nzimande.

== Branches libraries and partnerships ==
Branch libraries include:

- Cory Library for Historical Research
- Allistair Kerr Law Library
- Sound Library
- Teacher Resource Centre

Associated research libraries:

- International Library of African Music
- South African Institute of Aquatic Biodiversity (SAIAB)
- National English Literary Museum (NELM)

== Academic Library Consortia Membership ==
Rhodes University Library is part of the SEALS Library Consortium. The members of the consortium are: Nelson Mandela Metropolitan University Library, Walter Sisulu University Library, Fort Hare University Library, and Rhodes University Library. The South East Academic Library System (at times erroneously referred to as the South East Alliance of Library Systems), better known as SEALS, was conceptualized in 1996 as a regional library cooperative, and fully constituted in 1999 as a regional consortium, under the auspices of the Eastern Cape Higher Education Association (ECHEA) The purpose of SEALS is encapsulated in its vision statement: "The vision of SEALS is to create a virtual library for the Eastern Cape to promote and enhance information literacy, education, research, and economic development for all who need it."

== Milestones ==
- 8 April 1961: 'New' Library building officially opened;
- 9 April 1975: Law collection relocated and Law Library opened in Lincoln Inn.
- 1990: Card catalogue replaced with URICA, an automated integrated library management system.
- 2005/6: Rhodes University became the first academic library service in South Africa to launch its digital institutional repository, originally consisting mostly of theses and dissertations;
- 4 November 2010: The new Library Building was officially opened by the Minister of Education, Dr. Blade Nzimande
- 24 October 2013: Rhodes University through the endeavors of the Library Services signed the Berlin Declaration on Open Access to Knowledge in the Sciences and Humanities;
- 2015: Rhodes University Library becomes the first South African academic library, and, although unverified, also the first in Africa, to have retrospectively digitsed and made available all of the theses and dissertations submitted to the institution for degree purposes. This collection includes some theses predating the Rhodes University inauguration in 1951. The oldest thesis currently held within the institutional repository is dated 1928.
- 2020: Rhodes University Library launches Rhodes Research Data - the institutional repository for research data outputs and open educational resources at Rhodes University.

== University librarians ==
Prior to the establishment of a formal position of University Librarian or Director: Library Services, a number of individuals acted as honorary university librarians, including:

- Prof. R.J. Cholmeley

The role of official librarian was only established after 1937:

- 1943 - 1977: F.G. van der Riet
- 1978 - 1988: Gerald Quinn
- 1989 - 1994: Brian Paterson
- 1994 - 1995: Michael Berning (Acting)
- 1996 - 2000: Felix Ubogo
- 2001 - 2005: Margaret Kenyon (Initially Acting)
- 2006 - 2011: Gwenda Thomas
- 2011 - 2012: Jeanne Berger (Acting)
- 2012 - 2018: Ujala Satgoor
- 2019 - 2019: Wynand van der Walt & Larshan Naicker (Acting)
- 2019 July - current: Nomawethu Danster
