= Verashni Pillay =

South African journalist and editor (born 1984)

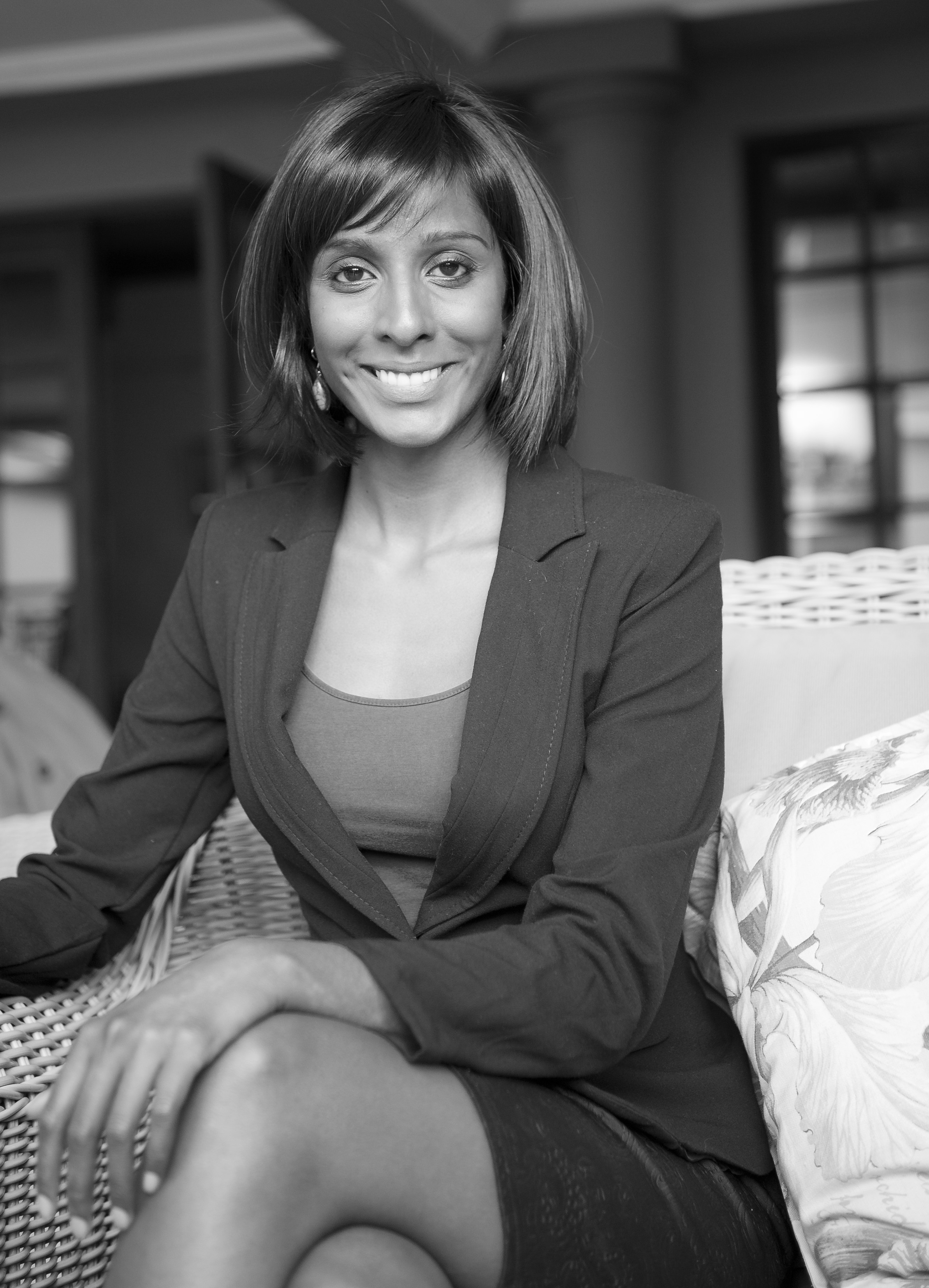
- Born: 11 February 1984 (age 42); Pretoria, South Africa
- Citizenship: South African
- Education: Bachelor of Journalism
- Alma mater: Rhodes University
- Occupations: Journalist, editor
- Awards: CNN Africa Journalism Award for digital journalism, Mandela Washington Fellowship, BBC 100 women

Verashni Pillay (born 11 February 1984) is a South African journalist and editor. She was the editor-in-chief of The Huffington Post South Africa and the Mail & Guardian. She was head of digital at South African radio station, POWER 98.7 and currently runs her own company, explain.co.za.

== Early life ==
Pillay was born on 11 February 1984 and grew up in Laudium, Pretoria. In 2007 she graduated with an honours degree in journalism from Rhodes University.

== Career ==
Pillay began working as a journalist in January 2007 at News24, after winning a bursary from the publication to complete her honours degree. She later joined the Mail & Guardian in 2009, where she rose quickly within the ranks of the publication. She was an early adopter of digital within journalism, winning two first-time digital categories at traditional journalism awards. In 2012 she won the prestigious CNN African Journalist of the Year award in the inaugural digital journalism category. In 2013 she won the inaugural Standard Bank Sikuvile award for multiplatform journalism.

Pillay has written extensively about race and gender. She contributed an essay to the collection, Categories of Persons (2013) about popular culture and language. In 2015 she was appointed as the editor-in-chief of the Mail & Guardian. Pillay was known for creating a strong editorial team and helped the Mail & Guardian grow in circulation. She increased year-on-year total circulation every quarter during her time as editor-in-chief of the M&G, the only SA newspaper in any category to do so in that period.

In 2015 she was selected as one of the BBC’s 100 Women. In 2016 she won the Standard Bank Sikuvile award in the columns/editorial category for a body of her work as a columnist.

On 1 November 2016 she was headhunted for the position of editor-in-chief at The Huffington Post (South Africa). After resigning on principle she joined radio station POWER 98.7 as head of digital.

== Controversy ==
In January 2016 Pillay co-wrote an article in the Mail & Guardian quoting sources that claimed Mmusi Maimane, leader of opposition party the Democratic Alliance, had been taking "leadership lessons" from the country's last apartheid leader FW de Klerk. Pillay later apologised for not taking more steps to verify the allegations and promised to improve processes and admit and fix mistakes quickly in future. Maimane and the DA accepted the apology.

In April 2017 the South African edition of the Huffington Post published a now deleted blog headlined "Could It Be Time To Deny White Men The Franchise?" that suggested white men should be denied the right to vote. Pillay initially defended the purported author behind the piece, who was on the receiving end of sexist attacks, and defended the underlying theme that white men held more power, while saying she did not agree with everything in the blog, in a now deleted article. It subsequently emerged the post had been written by a white man who had wanted to make a point about the lack of fact checking in South African media and who had intentionally based the argument on material errors. Pillay apologised.

She resigned on principle on 22 April 2017, following a ruling by the South Africa's Press Ombud that the fake article had amounted to hate speech. HuffPost SA and Media 24 immediately published and complied with the ruling, despite public concerns over its soundness and its definition of hate speech. Pillay appealed the ruling in her personal capacity. A full panel of the appeals board of the Press Ombud overturned that finding, in a closely followed hearing.

Following the incident Pillay noted in an interview that while she acknowledged her errors and had resigned because of them, her team had been operating in a stretched newsroom where the publisher insisted on 30 unique pieces of content a day, with three junior reporters. She said requests for sub editors had been turned down and that the blogs editor had been asked to double up as a reporter.

The HuffPost SA blogs editor, Sipho Hlongwane, was later made to face a disciplinary hearing but resigned before it took place.
