= Nick Binedell =

South African academic

Nicholas Arthur (Nick) Binedell
- Born: 05/12/1953
- Education: Rhodes University

Nick Binedell is a South African academic and the founding director of the Gordon Institute of Business Science of the University of Pretoria in Johannesburg, South Africa. During his university days he was actively involved in AIESEC.

He was previously director of the University of the Witwatersrand Graduate School of Business Administration from 1992 to 1997.

== Education ==
He obtained a Bachelor of Commerce from the Rhodes University, MBA from the University of Cape Town and a PhD from the University of Washington.

== Awards ==
- 2011 PMR.Africa Diamond Arrow Award for Individual in the Business School fraternity in South Africa doing most to enhance and develop the relevancy of business schools.

Academic offices
Preceded by	Director of the Gordon Institute of Business Science; 2000 – present	Incumbent
