= Cory Library for Historical Research =

Research library in Grahamstown, South Africa

Cory and Archives
- 33.314317°S 26.52187°E
- Location: Grahamstown, Eastern Cape, South Africa
- Type: Research library
- Scope: South African history, Eastern Cape history
- Established: 1933

Other information
- Director: Wynand van der Walt
- Website: www.ru.ac.za/corylibrary/

The Cory Library for Humanities Research, formerly The Cory Library for Historical Research, is a research library at Rhodes University, and is one of the branch libraries of the Rhodes University Library services. In addition to its preservation of Eastern Cape history, it also contains the archives of the Methodist Church of Southern Africa.

The library is named after Sir George Cory, chemist and historian, author of the six-volume "The Rise of South Africa". The Cory Library for Historical Research was established in 1933, with the donation of Cory's Africana collection to Rhodes University

== See also ==
- Rhodes University Library
- Xhosa Wars
