= George Cory (historian) =

South African historian and chemist

Sir George Cory
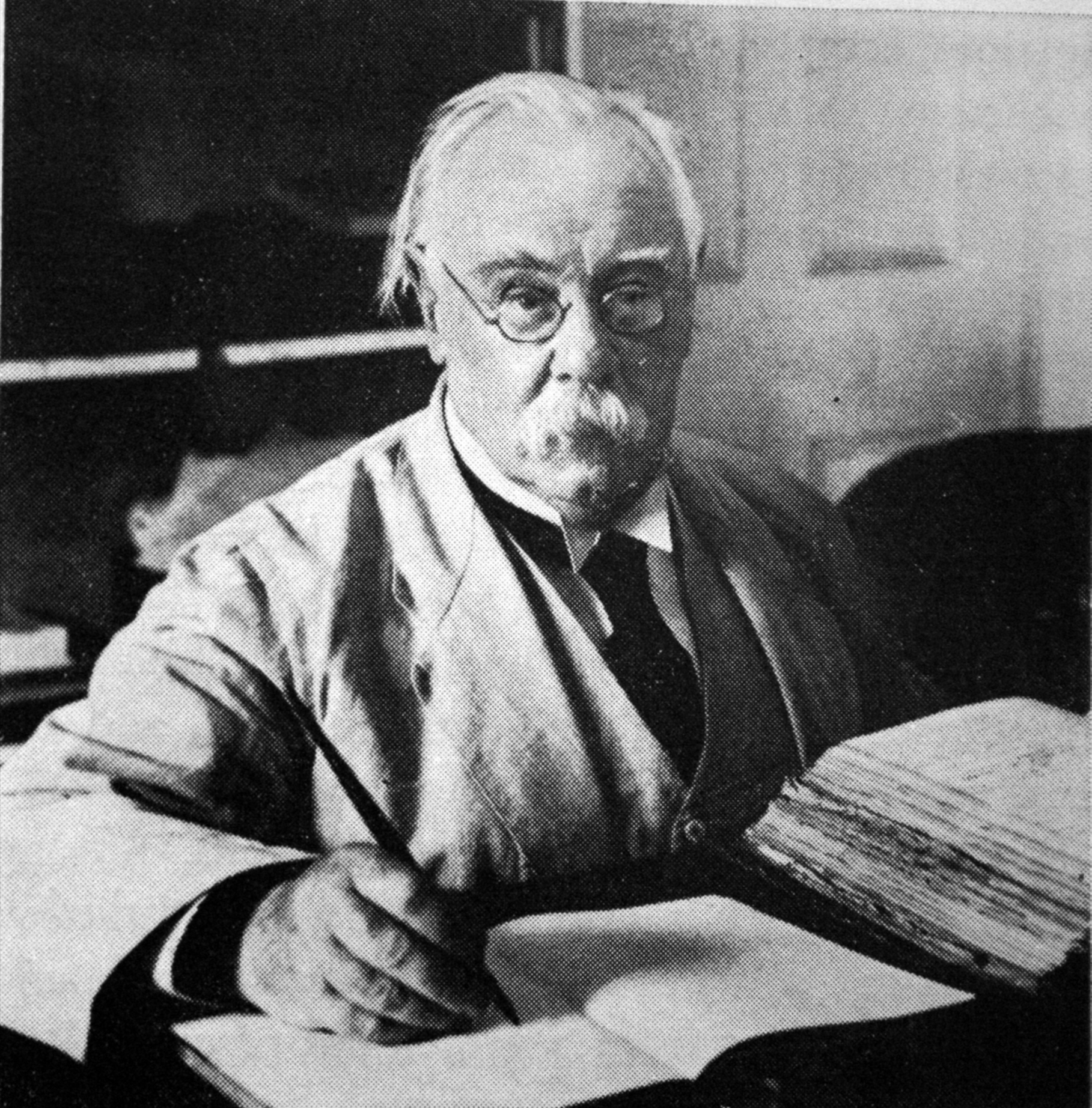
- Born: 3 June 1862; Stoke Newington
- Died: 28 April 1935 (aged 72); Cape Town
- Education: King's College, Cambridge
- Occupations: chemist and historian
- Known for: being one of the four founding professors at Rhodes University

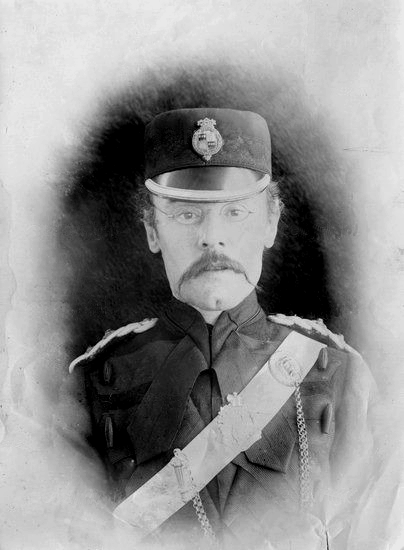
George Cory in the uniform of St Andrew's College Cadet Corps

Sir George Edward Cory (3 June 1862 in Stoke Newington – 28 April 1935 in Cape Town), was an English-born South African chemist and historian, best known for his six-volume publication "The Rise of South Africa".

== Early life ==
The son of George Nicholas Cory, George was apprenticed at age twelve to an ivory turner. He was privately tutored and later attended St. John's College at Hurstpierpoint. At the age of 23 he was employed as assistant telegraph engineer at Siemens Brothers in Woolwich. In 1881, together with Cameron Swan, son of the inventor Joseph Swan, he installed the first electric light in London in the Savoy Theatre. In 1886, he was admitted to the University of Cambridge as a non-collegiate student, graduating with a BA in 1888, taking honours in the Natural Sciences Tripos, becoming a member of King's College and appointed a demonstrator in chemistry while studying medicine in his spare time.

== Work in Grahamstown ==
He was awarded an MA degree in 1891 and emigrated to South Africa in the same year, taking up the position of vice-principal at the Grahamstown Public School . He soon went on to become government lecturer in physics and chemistry at St. Andrew's College in 1894. Here he founded the chemical laboratory, financed by Barney Barnato and other sponsors. On the establishing of Rhodes University College in 1904, Cory took up the post of Professor of Chemistry, a position he held until 1925 when he retired.

After his arrival in Grahamstown, Cory found a new interest in the history of the Eastern Province, perhaps sparked by his home in Grahamstown having formerly been the Drostdy, the residence of the Landdrost or magistrate. He wasted little time in developing an intellectual circle of friends – "Some time in 1892 or thereabouts, some of us—Meredith, Rev G W Cross, Adv. Lardner-Burke, Webb of St. Andrew's, all now dead—and myself started a Society called the "Athenaeum".

Cory started tracking down and questioning old Bantu chiefs and any survivors of the 1820 Settlers. During his spare time he travelled on foot and covered large areas of the Eastern Cape, amassing an enormous amount of historical data. The magistrate's office in Grahamstown had preserved a large number of letters, bound in volumes, and pertaining to public matters – material giving useful insight into life in the 1800s. The perusal, copying and summarising of these records was tackled by Cory over a number of years. At that time Leander Starr Jameson was prime minister of the Cape Colony and with a bequest made by Alfred Beit, arranged to assist Cory in his investigations, provided that some publication would result. Thus the first volume of The Rise of South Africa appeared in 1910. The success of this volume was such that the Rhodes Trustees sponsored further work and accordingly volumes 2 and 3 were published in 1913 and 1919, volume 4 in 1926 and volume 5 in 1930. Cambridge honoured Cory with a Doctor of Letters in 1921, and the following year he received a knighthood. Volume 6 of his work appeared posthumously in the Archives Year Book for 1939. Some time in 1915 Cory wrote and published, in a small print run, a paper entitled "A short history of slavery at the Cape.”

== Personal life ==
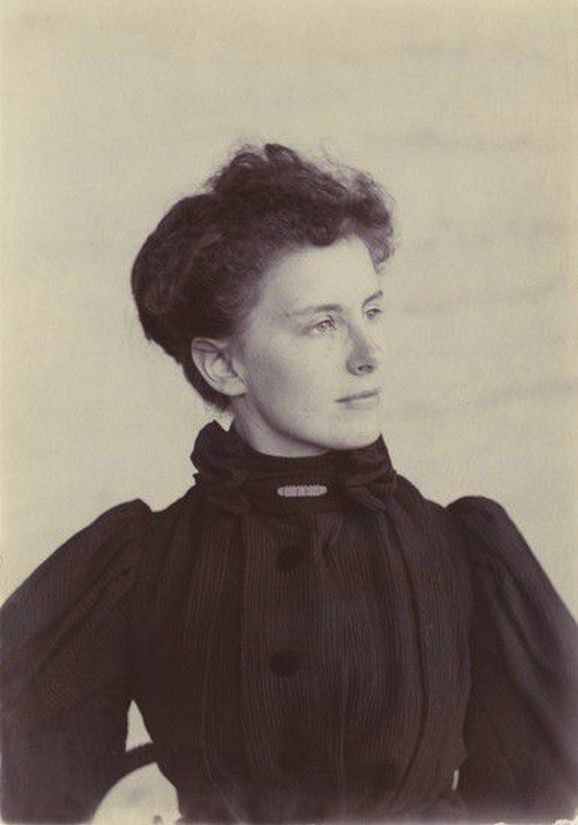
Lady Cory, née Gertrude Blades

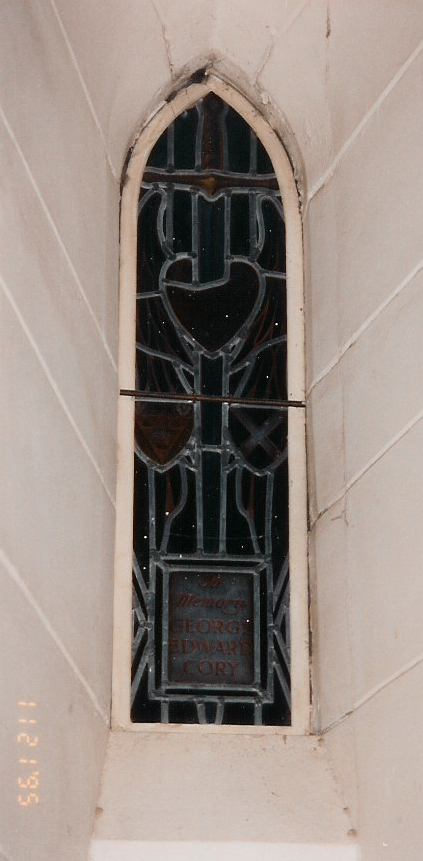
George Edward Cory Memorial window in The Cathedral of Saint Michael and Saint George, Grahamstown

George Cory married Gertrude Blades of Northwich in 1895, and they raised 6 children – Charles George Awdry 25 January 1898, Dulcibel Mowbray 1 November 1899, Sutu Alfrida 26 August 1902, John Hugh Mountain 12 July 1905, Robert Rhodes 24 June 1908, and Margaret Patricia Gertrude 28 July 1910. All were baptised in the Cathedral of St Michael and St George, Grahamstown. Charles (known as Chappie) served Grahamstown as a dentist for several decades. He died 24 August 1984. Dulcibel Mowbray became a botany teacher and plant collector, marrying Paul Ribbink, the Librarian of Parliament in 1932, and settling in Cape Town. She corresponded with the botanists Rudolf Marloth and Selmar Schonland.

Cory had a passion for church music and was a regular chorister at the Grahamstown Cathedral. He was known to be affable and a great conversationalist with a host of friends. Notwithstanding his academic duties he found time to serve on the Grahamstown City Council for two years and was a member of other public bodies. He was instrumental in the organising of Grahamstown's centenary celebrations in 1912 and promoted the 1820 Settlers' centenary in 1921. His knowledge of the Settlers and his lantern slide lectures made him a sought-after speaker on the subject. His famous slide collection is curated by the Cory Library for Humanities Research, at Rhodes University.

== Work as an historian ==
Visiting London in 1922 he came across the diary of the Rev. Francis Owen in the archives of the Church Missionary Society. Owen had been an eye-witness to the murder of Piet Retief and his party by Dingaan in 1838. Cory persuaded the Society to donate the diary to South Africa, and published an edited version in a Van Riebeeck Society memoir of 1926. He presided over the first dinner of the Rhodes University College alumni in London, at which occasion he was told that his portrait was to be painted by John Henry Amshewitz.

When Cory retired in 1925, he settled in Cape Town and spent his final years working in the Government Archives, having been appointed honorary archivist and historiographer. The Royal Empire Society awarded him a gold medal in 1933 for his historical work.

The Cory Library for Historical Research was started in 1931 when Cory donated his collection of books, letters, pamphlets, manuscripts, maps, journals, newspapers and photographs, to the Rhodes University College Library.

Cory, and George McCall Theal, have been branded as "settler" historians, although their goal was never to glorify settler history, and the pair have been undeservedly relegated to obscurity by some historians, notably Christopher Saunders and William Miller Macmillan. Even though his methods were meticulous and groundbreaking, Cory was rankled by the 'amateur' label affixed to him by professional historians. He was a pioneer in his use of "conversations" for gathering information. Previously, documentation was the only accepted medium considered reliable by others working in the same field. Cory also placed the issue of slavery squarely on the national historical agenda with his 1915 essay "Slavery at the Cape of Good Hope".

== Notable people from article ==
- Joseph Swan
- Barney Barnato
- Leander Starr Jameson
- Alfred Beit
- George McCall Theal
- William Miller Macmillan
- Rudolf Marloth
- Selmar Schonland
