= Catriona Ida Macleod =

South African educational psychologist and researcher

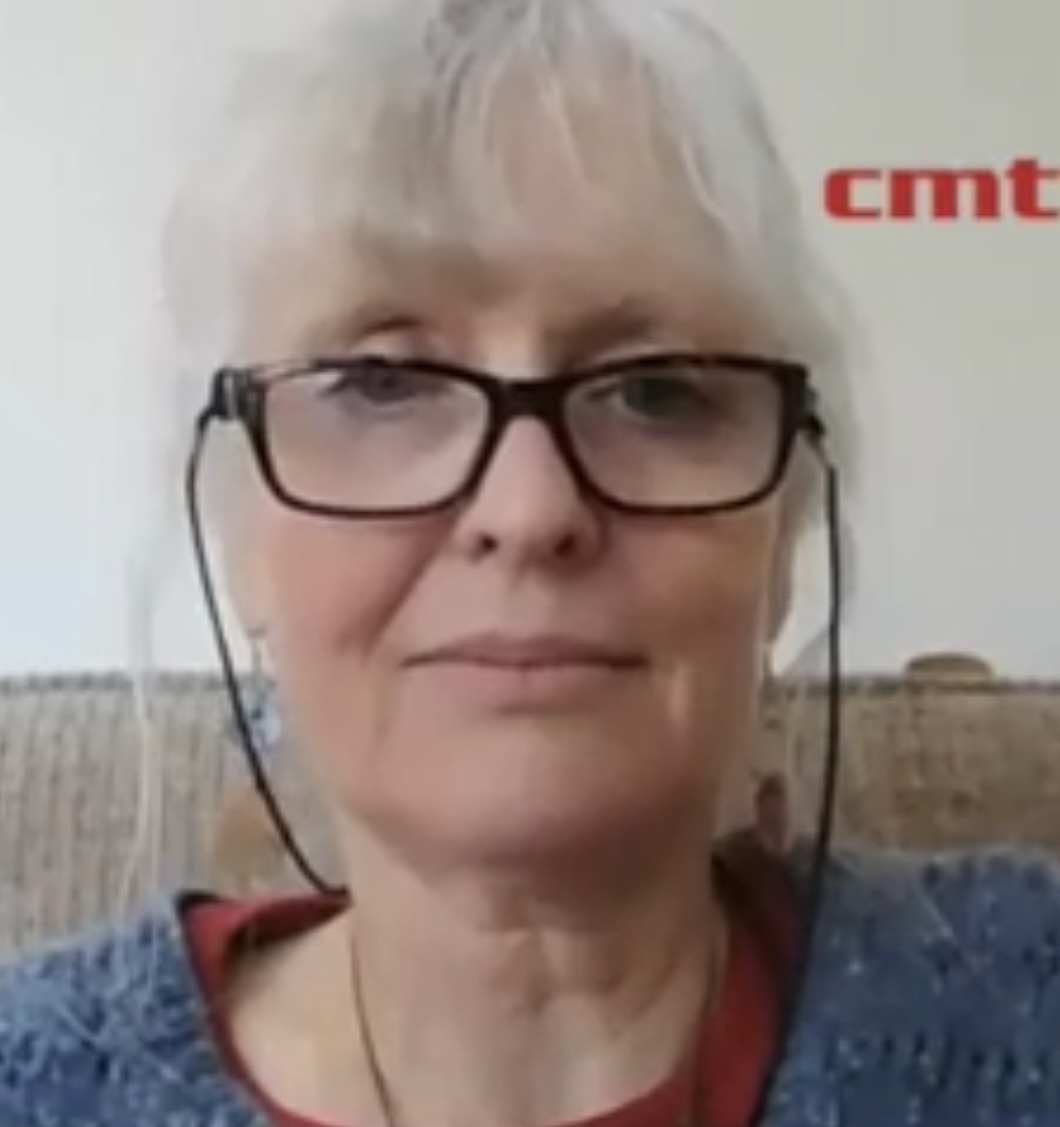
- Macleod in 2024
- Born: 11 April 1964 (age 62)
- Education: University of Natal; University of Cape Town
- Scientific career
- Workplaces: Rhodes University
- Thesis: The governmentality of teenage pregnancy: Scientific literature and professional practice in South Africa (1999)

Catriona Ida Macleod (born 11 April 1964) is a South African researcher. She is a distinguished professor of psychology, SARChI Chair of Critical Studies in Sexualities and Reproduction, and previous Head of the Psychology Department at Rhodes University. Her research focuses on sexual and reproductive health and feminist theory in psychology. Her book "Adolescence", Pregnancy, and Abortion: Constructing a threat of degeneration received the Distinguished Publication Award by the Association for Women in Psychology. Since 2013, she has been editor-in-chief of the international journal Feminism & Psychology.

== Early life and education ==
In 1984, Macleod earned a Bachelor of Science (BSc) degree in mathematics and psychology at the University of Natal. In 1990, she earned a Bachelor of Social Sciences (Honors) in psychology from the University of Cape Town. In 1993, she earned her master's degree in educational psychology from the University of Cape Town. In 1996, she entered a doctoral program at the University of Natal, where three years later she received her PhD. Her doctoral thesis, The governmentality of teenage pregnancy: Scientific literature and professional practice in South Africa, focused on the laws related to teenage pregnancy in South Africa.

== Research ==
Macleod's research focuses on sexual and reproductive health and feminist theory in psychology. Her work has dealt with issues of sexuality, such as abortion, sex education, and teenage pregnancy, and she was a co-founder of the Sexual and Reproductive Justice Coalition. She has also written about critical health, feminist, and theoretical psychologies, as well as produced works on post colonialism.

== Editorial positions and publications ==
Over the years, Macleod held many editorial positions at different institutions. In 2014, Macleod became the associate editor of the journal Feminism & Psychology. She also served on the South African Journal of Psychology editorial board. She has served as associate editor of Psychology in Society. She was a co-editor for Handbook of Qualitative Research Methods in Psychology. Her book entitled ‘Adolescence’, pregnancy and abortion: constructing a threat of degeneration (2010, Routledge) discusses central issues in the global debate concerning teenage pregnancy and abortion. In 2015, in collaboration with Tracy Morison, Macleod published the book Men's Pathways to Parenthood: Silence and Heterosexual Gendered Norms. In addition to publications in academic journals, she has written in the popular press, including "Why sexuality education in schools needs a major overhaul" for The Conversation.

== Awards and honors ==
- 1999, Vice-Chancellor's award for research as a Faculty of Education from University of Zululand
- 2004, Vice-Chancellor's merit research award for the Distinguished Senior Research from the University of Fort Hare
- 2011, Distinguished Publication Award of the Association for Women in Psychology (USA), ‘Adolescence’, pregnancy and abortion (2010, Routledge)
- 2012, Rhodes University Vice-Chancellor's Book Award, ‘Adolescence’, pregnancy and abortion (2010, Routledge)
- 2017, recognized by Rhodes University for her contributions to social change in South Africa and promotion of African-based psychology, for which she received The Social Change Award
- 2018, awarded the title of Distinguished Professor by Rhodes University
