= Igle Gledhill =

South African scientist

Irvy (Igle) Gledhill
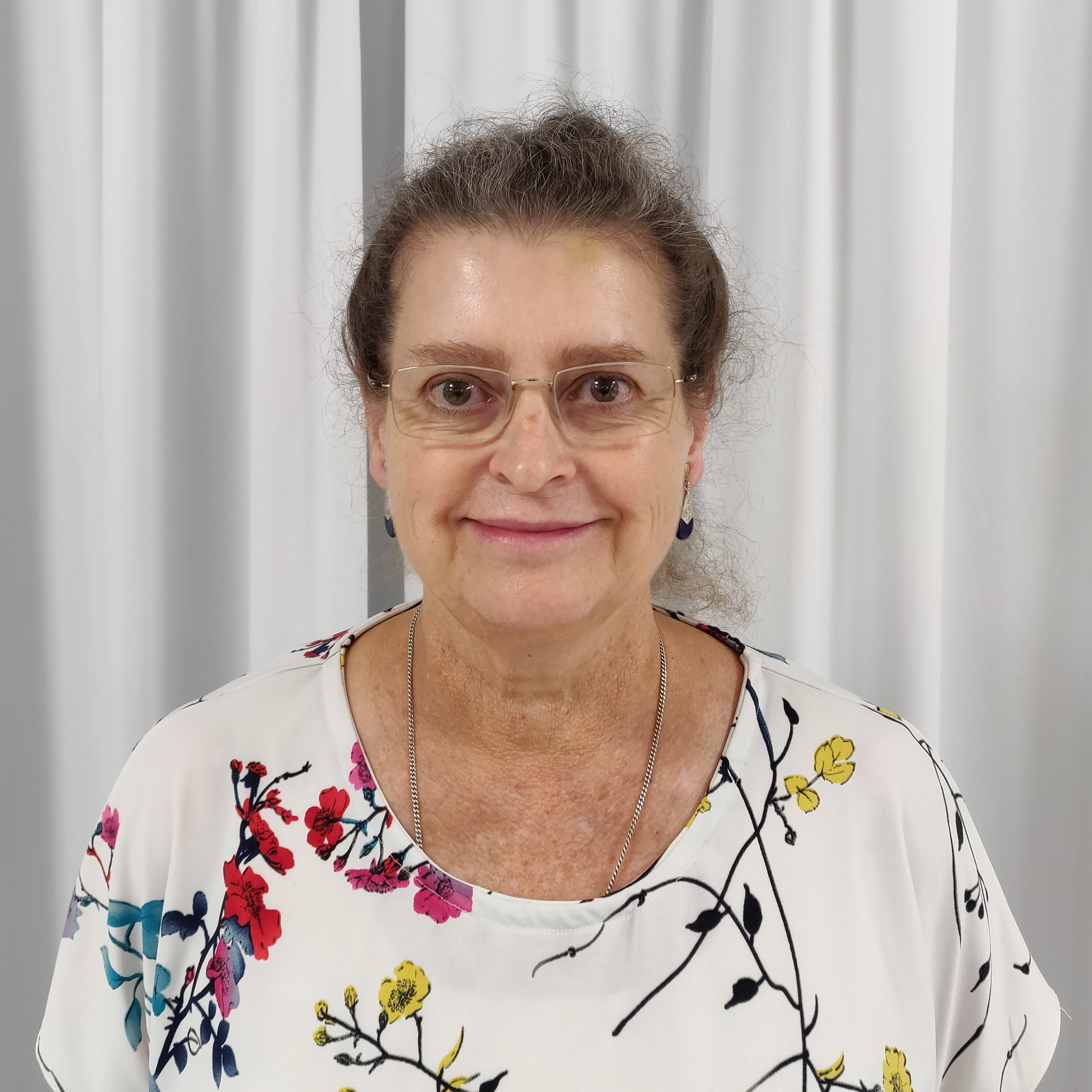
- Igle Gledhill
- Born: Irvy Marian Archibald Gledhill; 1957 (age 68–69); Gqeberha, South Africa
- Education: University of Natal
- Awards: D.Sc. (hc), Rhodes University 2024
- Scientific career
- Fields: Applied Computational Physics
- Institutions: University of Witwatersrand
- Thesis: (1983)
- Doctoral advisor: Manfred Hellberg
- Website: www.wits.ac.za/mia/about-the-school/staff/visiting-staff/

Irvy (Igle) Gledhill is a South African physicist at the University of Witwatersrand, School of Mechanical, Industrial & Aeronautical Engineering, in Johannesburg. She is a Vice President of the International Union of Pure and Applied Physics, and a Vice President of the Network of African Science Academies.

== Education ==
She has her bachelor's degree in physics, chemistry, and applied maths from Rhodes University in 1976 and an honours in Physics, 1977. She earned her PhD in plasma physics in 1983 from the University of Natal. Her research topic was Ion Acoustic Waves in Multi-Species Plasmas. She did postdocs at the University of California, Los Angeles in thermonuclear fusion, and in Space Shuttle-related plasma simulation at Stanford University's Space, Telecommunications and Radioscience Lab (STARLab).

== Career ==
Early in her career she modelled plasma behavior at the temperatures of the stars, and plasma fusion, and why galaxies are galaxy-shaped.

Starting in 1987, Dr. Gledhill worked as a fellow in the Defense Technology Operational Unit (Defencetek, later Defence, Peace, Safety and Security) of the Council for Scientific and Industrial Research (CSIR) South Africa. She specialized in transonic aerodynamics at Defencetek's Aeronautics Programme, using computational fluid dynamics (CFD). She also had a role in some of CSIR's strategic initiatives.

From 2000 to 2004, Dr. Gledhill served on South Africa's National Research Foundation panels. She was President of the South African Council for Automation and Computation from 1995 to 1996. From 2000 to 2008, she served as President of the South African Association for Theoretical and Applied Mechanics and Chair of the South African National Committee for International Union of Theoretical and Applied Mechanics (IUTAM). From 2006 to 2012, she was a member of IUTAM Working Party 9 on Education and Capacity Building. She was a member of the Advisory Panel on Control Systems in Competitive Industry for National Research Foundation (NRF) and of the International Panel on Shaping the future of physics in South Africa, a process for review and foresight developed by the South African Institute of Physics (SAIP), the Department of Science and Technology (DST), and the NRF. She became President of the South African Institute of Physics in 2013.

She was Chair of the Working Group on Women in Physics for the International Union of Pure and Applied Physics from 2014 to 2017, and is a member of the Executive of the Collaborative Project on the Gender Gap in Science funded by the International Science Council. She joined the Interdisciplinary Committee of the World Cultural Council in 2015.

Together with Nithaya Chetty, previous Vice-President of IUPAP, she was responsible in 2022 for founding IUPAP Working Group 21 on Physics for Climate Change Action and Sustainable Development, of which she now serves as Secretary. For her work in physics and in the advancement of women in science, she was awarded an Honorary Doctorate by Rhodes University in 2024.

Currently she is the Honorary Adjunct Professor in Flow Physics at the University of Witwatersrand and is Chair of the Advisory Board for African Physics Newsletter. In 2024 she was elected Vice President for Membership and Development, IUPAP. She has served as Vice-President for International Relations and Scientific Affairs of the Network of African Academies of Science.

== Awards and honors ==
- 1993-1994 President, | South African Council for Automation and Computation
- 2004 Award for Transformation, as a member of CFD Team: CSIR Defencetek “Assegai”
- 2009 Career Achievement Award, Defence, Peace, Safety and Security Operational Unit, CSIR
- 2013-2015 President, South African Institute of Physics
- 2012-2021 Member of Council, South African Council for Natural Scientific Professionals
- 2008-2010 Chair, CSIR Strategic Research Panel
- 2014-2017 Chair, IUPAP Working Group on Women in Physics
- 2015,2023 Member, World Cultural Council Interdisciplinary Committee
- 2019-present Ambassador for Women in Physics in South Africa, South African Institute of Physics
- 2019-2025 Vice-President for International Relations and Scientific Affairs, Network of African Science Academies
- 2020-present Member of Council, Academy of Science of South Africa
- 2022-present Member, American Physical Society Committee for International Scientific Affairs
- 2023 Fellow of the South African Institute of Physics, SAIP
- 2023 Fellow of the American Physical Society
- 2023 Significant Contribution to the Natural Scientific Professions Award, SA Council for Natural Scientific Professions
- 2024 National Science and Technology Forum/Science Diplomacy Capital for Africa Award for science diplomacy in Africa
- 2024 Doctor of Science (honoris causa), Rhodes University
- 2025 Vice President for Membership and Development, IUPAP
- 2026 Fellow of The World Academy of Sciences, TWAS

She is a member and Past Interim Vice President of the Academy of Science of South Africa, member of the South African Institute of Physics, the American Institute of Physics, and Sigma Xi, and is a registered Professional Scientist.
