= Jack Purdon =

Australian rules footballer (1930–2007)

Personal information
- Full name: John Patrick Purdon
- Born: 30 August 1930
- Died: 23 August 2007 (aged 76); Seymour, Victoria
- Original team: Northcote YCW
- Height: 180 cm (5 ft 11 in)
- Weight: 77 kg (170 lb)

Playing career^{1}
Years	Club	Games (Goals)
1950–51	Collingwood	25 (30)
- ^{1} Playing statistics correct to the end of 1951.

John Patrick Purdon (30 August 1930 – 23 August 2007) was an Australian rules footballer who played with Collingwood in the Victorian Football League (VFL).

== Family ==
The son of John Patrick Purdon (1902–1970), and Christina Johnston Purdon (1904–1989), née Matheson, John Patrick Purdon was born on 30 August 1930.

He married Joan Thomas (1933–1969) in 1953.
