= Patrick Purdon =

Scientist

Patrick Lee Purdon
- Born: Hong Kong
- Education: Harvard College; Massachusetts Institute of Technology
- Organization: Stanford University School of Medicine Department of Anesthesiology, Perioperative, and Pain Medicine
- Title: Professor of Anesthesiology, Perioperative and Pain Medicine at Stanford University School of Medicine; Professor of Bioengineering (by Courtesy) at Stanford University
- Website: purdonlab.stanford.edu

Patrick Lee Purdon is an American biomedical engineer whose research focuses on neuroscience, neuroengineering, and clinical applications. He is currently a professor of anesthesiology, Perioperative and Pain Medicine as well as Professor of Bioengineering (by Courtesy) at Stanford University. He previously held the Nathaniel M. Sims Endowed Chair in Anesthesia Innovation and Bioengineering at Massachusetts General Hospital and was an associate professor of anaesthesia at Harvard Medical School. Purdon received his Ph.D. in biomedical engineering from Massachusetts Institute of Technology in 2005. His research in neuroengineering encompasses the mechanisms of anesthesia, Alzheimer's disease and brain health, anesthesia and the developing brain, neural signal processing, and the development of novel technologies for brain monitoring. He has published over 90 peer-reviewed publications, is an inventor on 16 pending patents, and is a Fellow of the American Institute for Medical and Biological Engineering. Purdon has won many awards, including the prestigious National Institutes of Health Director's New Innovator Award, and his work has been covered in the popular media, including programs on Radiolab and NPR.

== Biography ==
Purdon was born in Hong Kong and grew up in Chula Vista, California. During high school, he was a finalist in the Westinghouse Science Talent Search, Regeneron Science Talent Search, and was a National Merit Scholar, and the valedictorian of Chula Vista High School. Purdon studied Engineering Sciences at Harvard College and received his A.B. (summa cum laude) in 1996. He attended MIT for his graduate studies, within the Harvard-MIT Division of Health Sciences and Technology Medical Engineering and Medical Physics (MEMP) programHarvard–MIT Program of Health Sciences and Technology. For his Master's thesis, he worked under the supervision of Drs. Robert Weisskoff and Victor Solo at the Martinos Center for Biomedical Imaging to develop novel signal processing methods for functional magnetic resonance imaging (fMRI) data analysis. He earned an S.M. degree in Electrical Engineering and Computer Science from MIT in 1998. In 1999, he joined the Neuroscience Statistics Research Laboratory directed by Dr. Emery Brown to study the neural mechanisms of anesthesia-induced unconsciousness in humans using simultaneous electroencephalography (EEG) and fMRI. Purdon was jointly supervised by Dr. Giorgio Bonmassar, with whom he developed novel technologies for simultaneous EEG-fMRI recordings during high-field MRI. Purdon received his Ph.D. in biomedical engineering at MIT in 2005. Purdon joined the faculty at Harvard Medical School and Massachusetts General Hospital in 2005. In 2017, he was appointed as the first incumbent of the Nathaniel M. Sims Endowed Chair in Anesthesia Innovation and Bioengineering at Massachusetts General Hospital. He was also an associate professor of Anaesthesia at Harvard Medical School. Purdon then joined Stanford University in 2023 as a professor of anesthesiology, Perioperative and Pain Medicine and Professor of Bioengineering (by Courtesy).

== Scientific contributions ==
=== Neural mechanisms of anesthesia ===
Purdon and his collaborators have been working on characterizing the neural mechanisms of anesthesia. In 2009, Purdon received a NIH Director's New Innovator Award to develop a neural systems approach for monitoring and drug administration for general anesthesia. Using a multiscale and multimodal approach in humans, Purdon and his team discovered that anesthetics produce prominent, highly structured neural oscillations that disrupt brain activity. This profound disruption of brain activity is thought to be a primary mechanism by which anesthetic drugs produce unconsciousness. The form of these oscillations correspond to the underlying molecular mechanisms of different anesthetic drugs, leading to the concept that different anesthetic drug classes have distinct "EEG signatures" that relate to their mechanisms of action. His work incorporates animal models, computational models, and human studies.

=== Anesthesia-induced brain oscillations in aging and development ===
Anesthetic drugs at brain circuits that change significantly during aging in adults and during development in children. Purdon and colleagues have shown that anesthesia-induced brain oscillations change significantly during aging and early childhood in a manner that likely reflects underlying brain aging and development. Purdon and colleagues are currently investigating how brain oscillations, anesthesia-induced or otherwise, could be used to better understand brain circuit function in humans during aging, Alzheimer's disease, development, and developmental disorders.

=== Clinical education ===
Purdon lectures to an international audience about the use of EEG-based brain monitoring to guide anesthesia care. He and his team have also developed online educational programming in collaboration with the International Anesthesia Research Society, available at .

=== Neural signal processing ===
Purdon has worked throughout his career to develop novel statistical signal processing methods for neuroscience. He has focused considerable effort on the EEG source localization problem, in which high-density scalp measurements are used to estimate underlying cerebral currents. His approach uses biophysical, functional neuroanatomic, and computational principles to guide the solution to this problem. His work has illustrated how neurophysiologically principled models of sparsity, connectivity, and dynamics can significantly expand the realm of what is possible using source localization, improving spatial resolution significantly, and enabling localization of subcortical activity.

== Awards and honor ==
Purdon's work has won many awards and has been featured on high-impact academic medium. For example, he received the National Institutes of Health Director's New Innovator Award from the National Institutes of Health in 2009, Honorable Mention of MGH Martin Prize from the Massachusetts General Hospital in 2013, the Innovation Development Grant Award from Mass General Brigham in 2014, Best in Neuroscience Award from the Society for Neuroscience in Anesthesiology and Critical Care in 2015, the Art of Talking Science competition winner from the Massachusetts General Hospital Research Institute in 2016, and an author and participant invitation to the Ernst Strungmann Forum Manifestations and Mechanisms of Dynamic brain Coordination over Development in 2017.

Purdon also fellow and member of several professional organizations, including the Society for Neuroscience, the American Society of Anesthesiologists, the Institute of Electrical and Electronics Engineers (IEEE), the International Anesthesia Research Society (IARS), the American Institute for Medical and Biological Engineering (AIMBE), the Society for Neuroscience in Anesthesiology and Critical Care, and the Association of University Anesthesiologists (AUA).

== Music ==
Purdon is also a jazz vocalist who performs regularly in the San Francisco Bay area.
