= James Cotterell Hoole =

South African politician

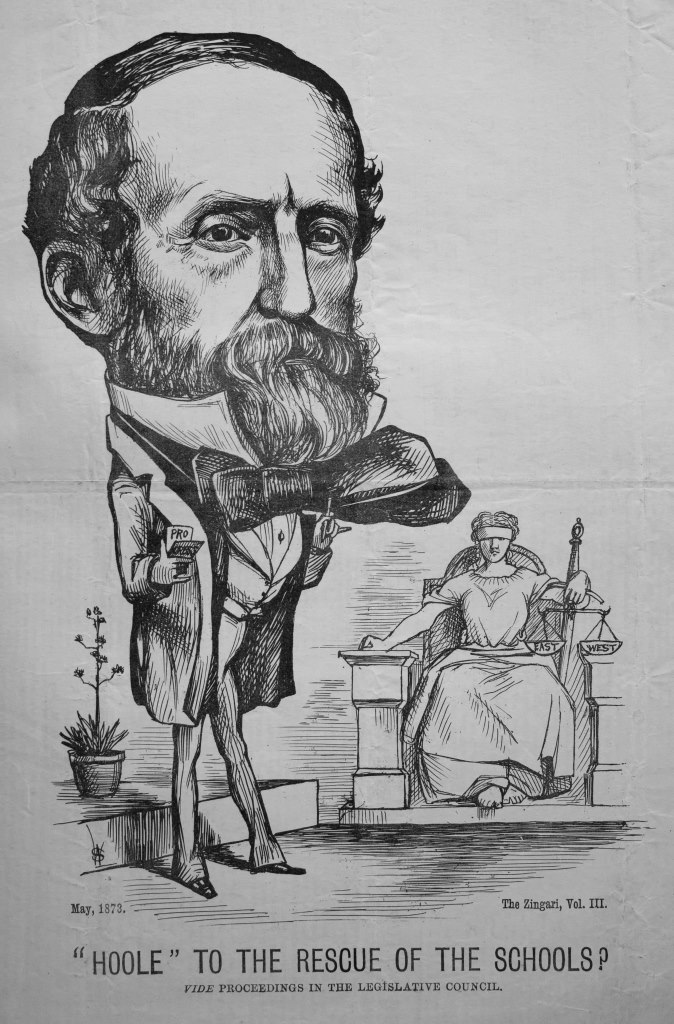
James Cotterell Hoole MLC. Cartoon from the Zingari

Hon.James Cotterell Hoole MLC (18 May 1816 – 29 Apr 1878) was a prominent member of the Legislative Council of the Cape Colony.

Hoole arrived in the Cape as a child, with his father and two siblings in 1820, and in the ensuing years was involved in the frontier wars of 1835 and 1846. He was a prominent businessman of the eastern frontier region of the Cape Colony and settled in Grahamstown.

In 1866, Hoole was elected to represent the Eastern Province of the Cape, in the upper house of the Cape Parliament, the Legislative Council. He served until Governor Philip Wodehouse dissolved both houses to combat the "responsible government" movement (which Hoole also opposed) in 1869.

He was re-elected the next year in 1870, but only kept his seat until 1872, when the Responsible Government movement successfully took over.

== Early life ==
On 18 May 1816 James Cotterell Hoole was born to James Hoole Sr and Jane Cotterell in Soho, London, England. Growing up Hoole had one older sibling and one younger sibling. On 3 December 1819 at the age of three Hoole moved to Grahamstown, Eastern Cape, South Africa. After moving to Eastern Cape James Hoole Sr and Jane Cotterell had four more children.

== Marriages ==
Hoole married Harriet Maria Rhodes (29 September 1834) whom he had seven children with. After Harriet's death in 1856 Hoole married Elizabeth Mary Cock (3 February 1857) and had three children with her. Elizabeth died in 1863 and Hoole married Isabella Bruce Findlay (approx. 1862) with whom he had two children.

== List of children ==
Children with Harriet Maria Rhodes

- Louisa Mortimer Hoole
- Harriet Cotterell Rhodes Hoole
- Edward Benjamin Cotterell Hoole
- George Rhodes Hoole
- Oliver Percival Porter Hoole
- Abel Pemberton Worth Hoole
- Joseph Arthur Sidney Hoole

Children with Elizabeth Mary Cock

- Lydia Cock Hoole
- Elizabeth Downing Toy Hoole
- Thomas Toy Hoole

Children with Isabella Bruce Findlay

- Jane Isabella Hoole
- Amy Findlay Hoole

== Death ==
Hoole died on 29 Apr 1878 in Grahamstown, Eastern Cape, South Africa
