= Rhodes University =

Public university in Makhanda (Grahamstown), South Africa

- Coat of arms
- Former names: Rhodes University College
- Motto: Where leaders learn
- Type: Public
- Established: 31 May 1904; 122 years ago
- Affiliations: AAU, ACU, HESA, IAU
- Endowment: R2.2 billion (2023)
- Chancellor: Mbuyiseli Madlanga
- Vice-Chancellor: Sizwe Mabizela
- Academic staff: 357
- Students: 7,005
- Undergraduates: 5,372
- Postgraduates: 1,633
- Location: Makhanda, Eastern Cape, South Africa; 33°18′49″S 26°31′11″E
- Campus: Urban
- Colours: Purple; White
- Nickname: Rhodian
- Website: www.ru.ac.za

Rhodes University (Afrikaans: Rhodes Universiteit) is a public research university located in Makhanda (Grahamstown) in the Eastern Cape province of South Africa. It is one of four universities in the province.

Established in 1904, Rhodes University is the province's oldest university, and it is the sixth oldest South African university in continuous operation, being preceded by the University of the Free State (1904), University of Witwatersrand (1896), University of South Africa (1873) as the University of the Cape of Good Hope, Stellenbosch University (1866) and the University of Cape Town (1829). Rhodes was founded in 1904 as Rhodes University College, named after Cecil Rhodes, through a grant from the Rhodes Trust. It became a constituent college of the University of South Africa in 1918 before becoming an independent university in 1951.

The university had an enrollment of over 8,000 students in the 2015 academic year, of whom just over 3,600 lived in 51 residences on the campus, with the rest (known as Oppidans) taking residence off-campus (in rented "digs" or in their own homes).

== History ==
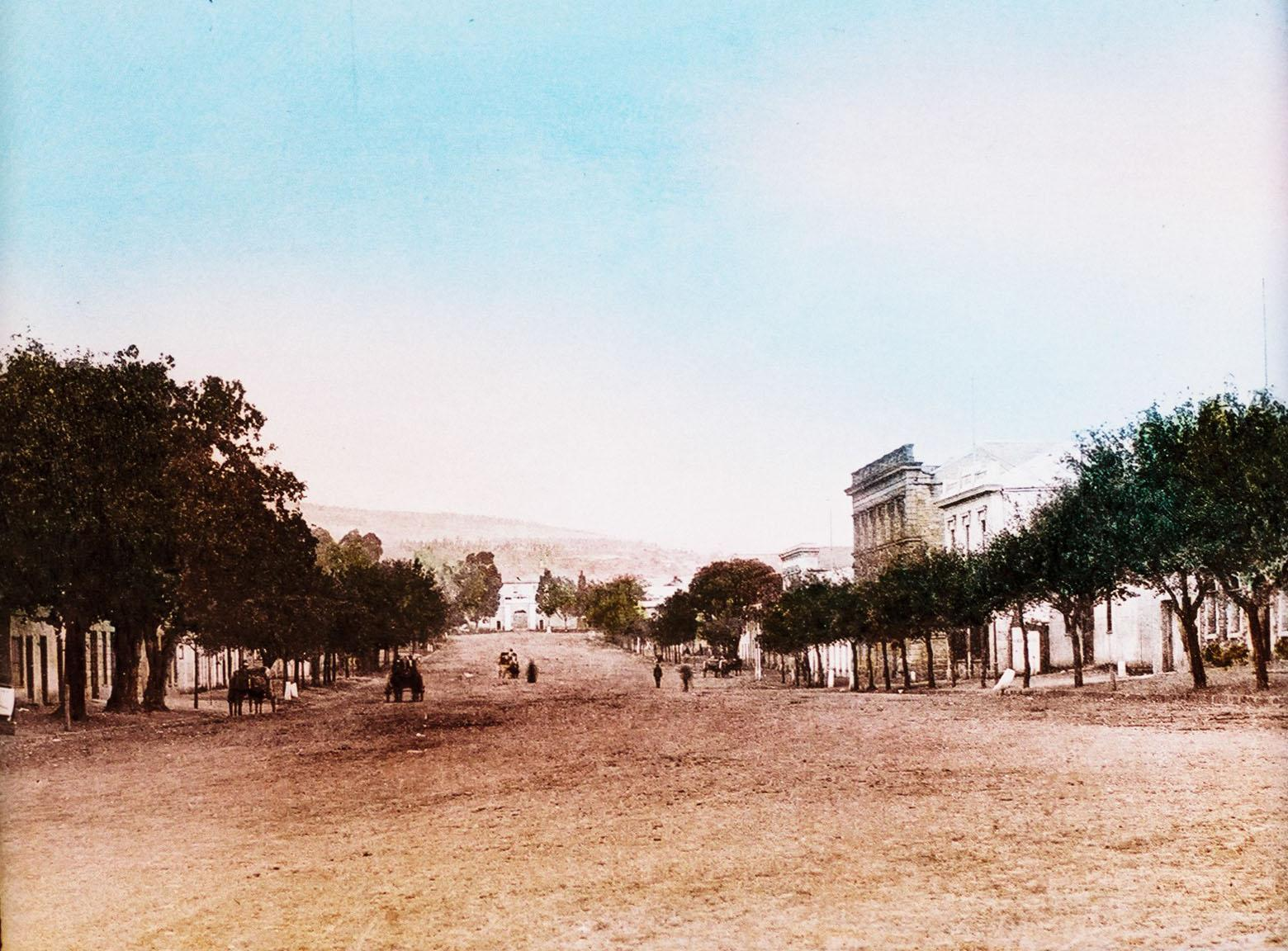
View of High Street looking west from the corner of Hill Street towards the Drostdy Arch, the main entrance to the present-day Rhodes University campus, c. 1898

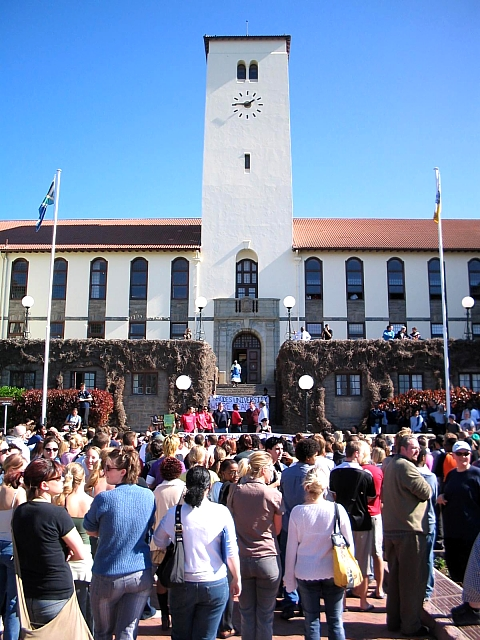
The Sir Herbert Baker clock tower at the heart of the Rhodes campus. The clock tower was designed by Herbert Baker in 1910 and constructed in subsequent years.

Although a proposal to found a university in Grahamstown had been made as early as 1902, financial problems caused by the Frontier Wars in Albany prevented the proposal from being implemented. In 1904 Leander Starr Jameson issued £50 000 preferred stock to the university from the Rhodes Trust. With this funding Rhodes University College was founded by an act of parliament on 31 May 1904.

University education in the Eastern Cape began in the college departments of four schools: St. Andrew's College; Gill College, Somerset East; Graaff-Reinet College; and the Grey Institute in Port Elizabeth. The four St Andrew's College professors, Arthur Matthews, George Cory, Stanley Kidd and G. F. Dingemans became founding professors of Rhodes University College.

At the beginning of 1905, Rhodes moved from cramped quarters at St Andrew's to the Drostdy building, which it bought from the British Government. Rhodes became a constituent college of the new University of South Africa in 1918 and it continued to expand in size. When the future of the University of South Africa came under review in 1947, Rhodes opted to become an independent university.

Rhodes University was inaugurated on 10 March 1951. Sir Basil Schonland, son of Selmar Schonland, became the first chancellor of his alma mater, and Dr. Thomas Alty the first vice-chancellor. In terms of the Rhodes University Private Act, the University College of Fort Hare was affiliated to Rhodes University. This mutually beneficial arrangement continued until the apartheid government decided to disaffiliate Fort Hare from Rhodes. The Rhodes Senate and Council objected strongly to this, and to the Separate University Education Bill, which they condemned as interference with academic freedom. However, the two bills were passed, and Fort Hare's affiliation to Rhodes came to an end in 1959. Nevertheless, in 1962 an honorary doctorate was conferred on the state president, C. R. Swart, who (as Minister of Justice after 1948) had been responsible for the repression of opposition political organisations. The award caused the resignation of the chancellor, Sir Basil Schonland, although his reasons were not made public at the time.

James Hyslop succeeded Alty in 1963. In 1971, Rhodes negotiated to purchase the closed teacher training college run by the sisters of the Community of the Resurrection of our Lord including the buildings and grounds and a number of adjacent buildings, facilitating further expansion.

The original Rhodes coat of arms

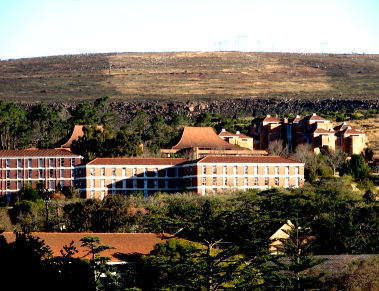
Kimberley Hall is currently one of nine halls on campus.

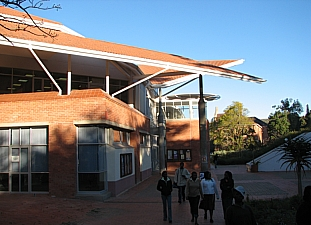
The new Eden Grove building at Rhodes University

== Campus ==
During 2008 work began on construction of a new library building at a cost of R85 million, one of the largest infrastructure projects undertaken by the university, and was completed in 2010.

== Organisation and administration ==
=== Faculties and Schools ===
Rhodes has six faculties:

- Humanities (1952)
- Commerce
- Law
- Science
- Education
- Pharmacy

The six faculties are further subdivided into 30 academic departments, of which 11 form part of the humanities faculty. As of 2009 the humanities faculty, being the largest in the university, consisted of 40% of the student intake of undergraduate and postgraduate studies, enrolling 2669 students as of 2009.

=== Law clinic ===
Rhodes University operates a law clinic, which operates as a firm of attorneys providing training to law students and free legal services for indigent people. The law clinic operates from two offices, one in Makhanda and one in Komani. The law clinic came to national attention in July 2013 when it represented 15 members of Nelson Mandela's family in their litigation against Mandla Mandela (Nelson's grandson) concerning the location of family grave sites.

=== NALSU ===
The Neil Aggett Labour Studies Unit (NALSU), named in honour of Neil Aggett, a medical doctor who died at the hands of apartheid-era Security Branch police in 1982. It was established in 2012 (formally launched in 2014) through a partnership between the university and a department of the Eastern Cape Provincial Government. NALSU team members are from three academic departments: Sociology and Industrial Sociology (where the unit is located), History, and Economics and Economic History. NALSU has research partnerships with a number of national and international research and advocacy organisations.

== Academics ==
Rhodes is a small, highly residential university. For most undergraduates, first and second years of study are done while living in campus residences.

Rhodes' academic program operates on a semester calendar, beginning in early-February to early-June, and the second semester beginning in late-July and ending late-November.

Undergraduate tuition for the first year of study in 2011 towards a Bachelor of Arts and Bachelor of Science degree was R26,590 and R27,720, respectively, and the cost of board was between R35,700 and R37,600.

=== Student body ===
Rhodes admitted 1592 students in 2012.

The tables below show the racial and gender composition of the university for that year.

Racial composition of student body (2012)
	Undergraduate	Postgraduate	Eastern Cape	South Africa
Black	54%	49%	86.3%	79.6%
Coloured	4%	3%	8.3%	9%
White	38%	44%	4.7%	8.9%
Asian	4%	4%	0.4%	2.5%

Gender composition of student body (2012)
	Black	Coloured	White	Asian	All students	South Africa
Female	61%	67%	53%	61%	58%	51%
Male	39%	33%	47%	39%	42%	49%

=== SARChi chairs ===
Rhodes holds fourteen national research chairs appointed under the South African Research Chairs Initiative. This accounts for approximately 7% of the total awarded nationally in South Africa, a significant proportion given the university's small size.

- Critical Studies in Sexualities and Reproduction: Human and Social Dynamics (Catriona Macleod)
- Marine Ecosystems (Christopher McQuaid)
- Radio Astronomy Techniques and Technologies (Oleg Smirnov)
- Medicinal Chemistry and Nanotechnology (Tebello Nyokong)
- Mathematics Education (Marc Schafer)
- Numeracy (Mellony Graven)
- Intellectualisation of African Languages, Multilingualism and Education (Dion Nkomo)
- Insects in Sustainable Agricultural Ecosystems (Steve Compton)
- Interdisciplinary Science in Land and Natural Resource Use for Sustainable Livelihoods (Charlie Shackleton)
- Marine Natural Products Research (Rosemary Dorrington)
- Biotechnology Innovation & Engagement (Janice Limson)
- Global Change Social Learning Systems Development: Transformative Learning and Green Skills Learning (Heila Lotz-Sisitka)
- Geopolitics and the Arts of Africa (Ruth Simbao)
- Molecular and Cellular Biology of the Eukaryotic Stress Response (Adrienne Edkins)

== Research bodies ==
- Centre for Biological Control

== Student life ==
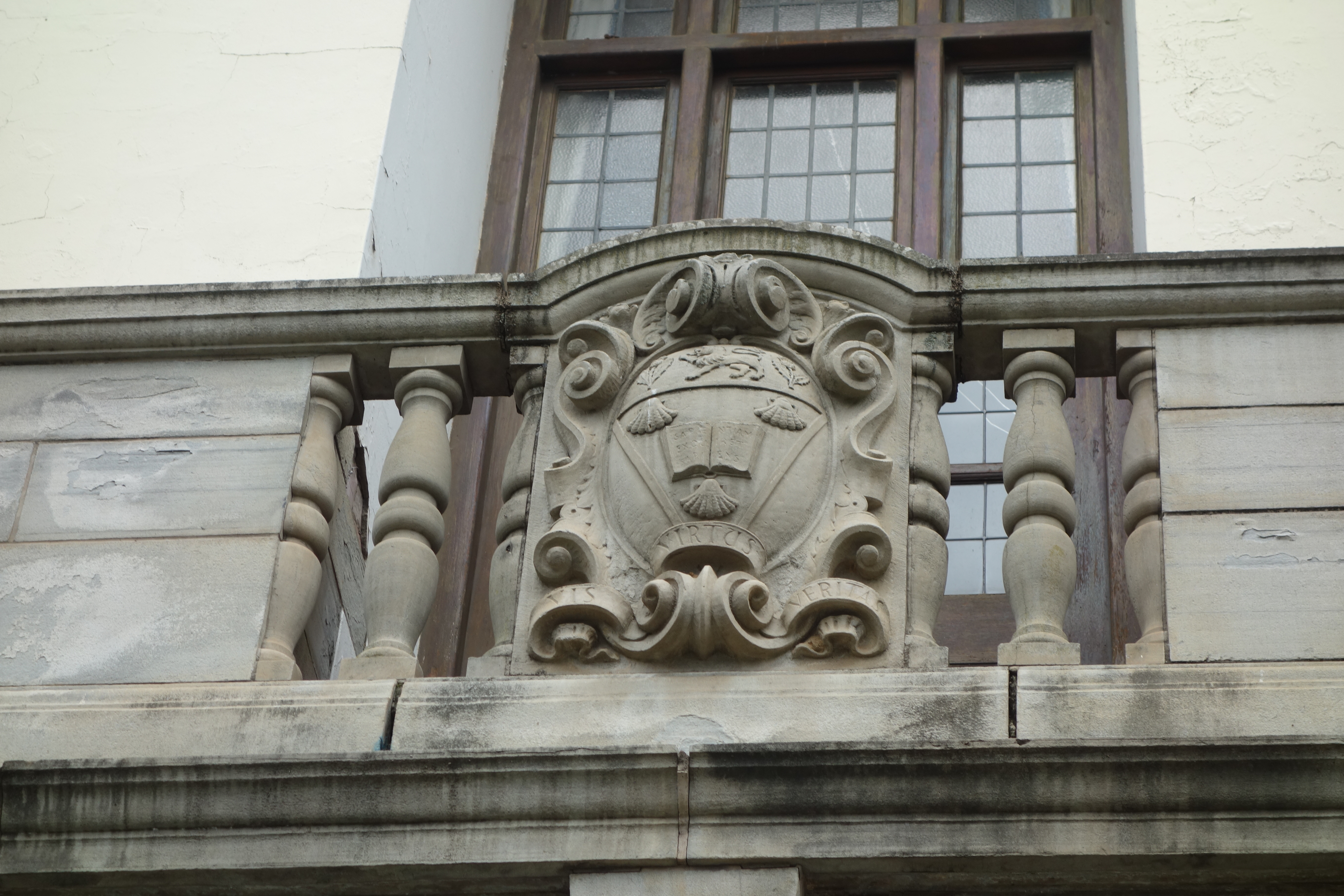
Vis, virtus, veritas

=== Halls of residence ===
- Allan Webb Hall
- Courtenay-Latimer Hall
- Desmond Tutu
- Hugh Masekela Hall
- Drostdy Hall
- Founders Hall
- Hobson Hall
- Solomon Mahlangu Hall
- Miriam Makeba Hall (formerly Kimberley Hall East)
- Kimberley Hall West
- Lilian Ngoyi Hall
- Nelson Mandela Hall
- St Mary Hall

=== Media ===
Three student newspapers, Activate, The Oppidan Press and Cue, have been published daily during the National Arts Festival held in Makhanda every year for several decades. Activate celebrated its 65th birthday in 2012, while The Oppidan Press was only first published in 2007, and its target readership was mainly Oppidans. The journal Philosophical Papers is edited in the department of philosophy.

== Scholarly journals ==
Rhodes University faculties and departments produce scholarly journals, including:

- African Music: Journal for the International Library of African Music
- African Journal of Higher Education Community Engagement
- English in Africa
- Journal of Contemporary African Studies
- Rhodes Journalism Review

== Ranking ==
In 2011, the Webometrics Ranking of World Universities ranked Rhodes 5th in South Africa and 700th globally.

Times Higher Education Ranking 2023 to 2024
Year	World Rank
2023	801–1000

== Notable alumni and staff ==
In academia, Old Rhodian Max Theiler was awarded the Nobel Prize in Physiology or Medicine for his research in virology in 1951.

=== Notable alumni: general ===
- Matthew Muir – Artist
- Beth Diane Armstrong – Sculptor
- Diane Awerbuck – Writer
- Norman Bailey – Opera singer
- Nick Binedell – Founding director of the Gordon Institute of Business Science of the University of Pretoria
- Troy Blacklaws – Novelist
- Alex Boraine – Politician; academic; co-founder of IDASA (Institute for Democracy in South Africa) and the International Center for Transitional Justice
- Sir Rupert Bromley, 10th Bt. – Business executive
- Guy Butler – Poet
- Efemia Chela – writer
- Tafadzwa Chitokwindo – Zimbabwe Sevens rugby player
- Nan Cross – Anti-conscription and anti-apartheid activist
- Achmat Dangor – Writer
- Embeth Davidtz – Actress
- Rob Davies – Minister of trade and industry of South Africa
- Mick Davis – Businessman, chief executive of Xstrata
- Geoffrey de Jager – Philanthropist and industrialist; founder of Rand Merchant Bank
- K. Sello Duiker – Novelist and screenwriter
- Sir Michael Edwardes – Business executive
- Robin Esrock – Travel Writer
- Allan Gray – Investor and philanthropist
- Mluleki George – ANC MP and former prisoner on Robben Island
- Igle Gledhill – Physicist
- Chris Hani – Former leader of the South African Communist Party and chief of staff of Umkhonto we Sizwe
- Michael Harmel - Journalist and activist
- Errol Harris – Philosopher
- Trevor Hastie – Statistician
- Peter Hinchliff – Anglican priest and academic
- Humphry Knipe – Adult film writer/director
- Herbert Kretzmer – Fleet Street journalist and lyricist of inter alia the musical Les Misérables
- Alice Krige – Actress
- Margaret Legum – Economist and anti-apartheid activist
- Frances Margaret Leighton – Botanist
- Kai Lossgott – Interdisciplinary artist
- Mbuyiseli Madlanga – South African Constitutional Court judge
- Mandla Mandela – Chief of the Mvezo Traditional Council and grandson of Nelson Mandela
- The Hon Justice Lex Mpati – Judge President of the Supreme Court of Appeal of South Africa and current chancellor of Rhodes University
- Patrick Mynhardt – Actor
- Siphesihle Ndaba – Actress
- Marguerite Poland – Writer
- Ian Roberts – Actor
- Michael Roberts – Historian
- Kathleen Satchwell – Judge
- Sir Basil Schonland – Scientist
- Barry Smith – Musician
- Ian Smith – Former Prime Minister of Rhodesia (now Zimbabwe)
- Wilbur Smith – Novelist
- William Smith – Television science and mathematics personality
- Kaneez Surka – Artist, actor and comedian
- Robert V. Taylor – Former dean of St. Mark's Episcopal Cathedral, Seattle
- Phumzile van Damme – MP and Shadow Communications Minister
- Max Theiler – Virologist, Nobel Prize winner (1951)
- Micheen Thornycroft – Zimbabwe Olympic rower
- Kit Vaughan – Emeritus professor of biomedical engineering at UCT
- David Webster – Social anthropologist and anti-apartheid activist
- Andrew Whitfield - South African politician, former deputy minister, and Member of Parliament
- Mark Winkler – Author
- Timothy Woods – Former head of Gresham's School, England
- Dana Wynter – Actress
- Simphiwe Tshabalala – Standard Bank CEO

=== Notable alumni: journalists, media celebrities in South Africa ===
One of the most well-known departments on the Rhodes campus is the university's school of Journalism and Media Studies, through which many of South Africa's most notable media celebrities have passed. There are also an especially high number of radio celebrities who graduated at Rhodes – many of them having spent time with the university's campus radio station Rhodes Music Radio.

- Matthew Buckland – Media-owner and entrepreneur
- Steve Linde (born 1960) – newspaperman
- Anand Naidoo – Anchor and correspondent for Al Jazeera English based in Washington DC; previously with CNN
- Jeremy Mansfield – Radio host, television presenter, comedian
- Karyn Maughan – Legal journalist
- Eusebius McKaiser – Social activist, author, radio show host
- Haru Mutasa – Correspondent for Al Jazeera International
- Zaa Nkweta – Former Carte Blanche presenter
- Verashni Pillay – Mail & Guardian editor-in-chief
- Toby Shapshak – Journalist and African technology thought leader
- Barry Streek – Political journalist and anti-apartheid activist
- Rob Vember – 5FM DJ

=== Notable staff ===
- Thomas Alty – physicist; Principal and Vice Chancellor of the university
- Margaret Ballinger – Political activist; taught in the history department
- André Brink – Writer
- Andrew Buckland – Performer and playwright
- Julian Cobbing – Professor of African history; wrote an influential and controversial theory on the nature of the Mfecane
- Ward Jones – Professor of philosophy
- Don Maclennan – Professor of English and notable poet
- Catriona Ida Macleod, head of the psychology department
- Obie Oberholzer – Photographer
- D. C. S. Oosthuizen – Philosopher, Christian, critic of apartheid
- Selmar Schonland – Botanist
- J. L. B. Smith – Ichthyologist; first to identify a taxidermied fish as a coelacanth, a fish previously thought to be extinct
- H. W. van der Merwe – Founder of the Centre for Intergroup Studies, University of Cape Town
- Etienne van Heerden – Writer
- Arthur Matthews (mathematician), founding professor at the university
- Graham Glover - Author, Associate professor, editor of the South African Law Journal

== Name controversy ==
The university's name references Cecil Rhodes, a British businessman who heavily aided British imperial interests in South Africa, which led to controversy starting in 2015. Protests held that year by Rhodes Must Fall led to the University of Cape Town removing a statue of Rhodes, and similar protests against Rhodes' legacy occurred at Rhodes University. Some students and outlets started referring to it as "The University Currently Known As Rhodes". In 2015 the university council undertook to determine whether or not the institution should change its name, as well as consider several other ways it could deal with the issues.

In 2017, the Rhodes University Council voted 15–9 in favour of keeping the existing name. While the university agreed with critics that "[it] cannot be disputed that Cecil John Rhodes was an arch-imperialist and white supremacist who treated people of this region as sub-human", it also said it had long since distanced itself from the person and had distinguished itself with the name Rhodes University as one of the world's best. The main argument against the change was financial, as such a change would cost a significant amount of money and the university was already having trouble with its budget. Furthermore, changing the university's name could have an adverse effect on its recognition internationally.

== See also ==
- List of universities in South Africa
- 1820 Settlers National Monument
- National Arts Festival
- BRICS Universities League
