= Power FM (South Africa) =

Johannesburg; South Africa
- Broadcast area: Gauteng
- Frequency: 98.7 MHz

Ownership
- Owner: MSG Afrika Investment Holdings
- Sister stations: Capricorn FM

History
- First air date: 18 June 2013

Links
- Website: www.powerfm.co.za

Power FM (also known as Power 98.7 FM) is a South African commercial radio station based in Gauteng, seed funded by the National Empowerment Fund, a state-owned enterprise in South Africa.

It was awarded an FM radio frequency commercial license from ICASA on 15 December 2011 and went on-air on the 18 June 2013.

The radio station is owned by MSG Afrika Investment Holdings, led by Given Mkhari, with shareholders including Ndalo Media, led by Khanyi Dhlomo; Zico, led by Sandile Zungu; and various other investors, including the South African government.

== Broadcast languages ==
- English

== Broadcast time ==
- 24/7

== Coverage area ==
- National

== Target audience ==
- Age Group 15 - 49
- LSM 6 - 10

== Programme format ==
- 70% Talk
- 30% Music
- During weekdays, it broadcasts talk content from 05am to 00am and music will broadcast from midnight till 05am.
- During weekends, it broadcasts music around the clock, with talk elements at various intervals.

== Location ==
The station is based in:
POWER HOUSE, 79 Central Street, Houghton Estate, Gauteng
