= Mail & Guardian =

South African newspaper

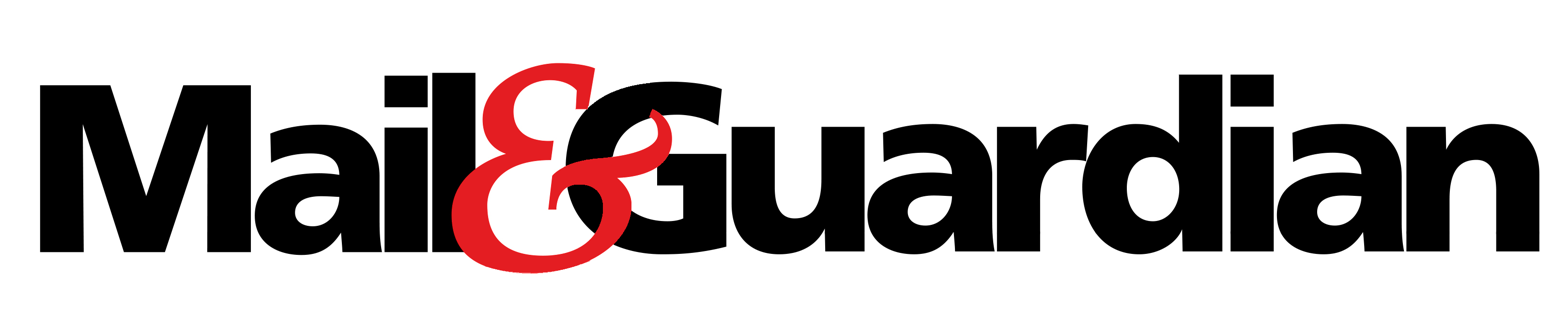

- Front page of the Mail & Guardian on 4 April 2025
- Type: Weekly newspaper
- Format: Tabloid
- Owner(s): M&G Media Ltd
- Founded: 1985; 41 years ago
- Headquarters: Johannesburg, Gauteng, South Africa
- Circulation: 25,834
- Website: www.mg.co.za

The Mail & Guardian, formerly the Weekly Mail, is a South African weekly newspaper and website, published by M&G Media in Johannesburg, South Africa. It focuses on political analysis, investigative reporting, Southern African news, local arts, music and popular culture.

The Mail & Guardian is considered the newspaper of record for South Africa, due to its reputation for in-depth analysis, critical reporting, and neutrality.

== History ==
The publication began as the Weekly Mail, an alternative newspaper by a group of journalists in 1985 after the closure of two leading liberal newspapers, The Rand Daily Mail and the Sunday Express.

The Weekly Mail criticised the government and its apartheid policies, which led to the banning of the paper in 1988 by then State President P. W. Botha. The paper was renamed the Weekly Mail & Guardian from 30 July 1993. The paper almost folded in the early 1990s after a failed attempt to reinvent itself as a daily newspaper. The London-based Guardian Media Group (GMG), the publisher of The Guardian, became the majority shareholder of the print edition in 1995, and the name was changed to Mail & Guardian.

In 2002, 87.5% of the company was sold to the Newtrust Company Botswana Limited, which was owned by Trevor Ncube, a Zimbabwean publisher and entrepreneur. Ncube took over as the CEO of the company.

In 2006 MD Africa became the Mail & Guardian's national distributor. The change resulted in good circulation growth, despite difficult market conditions. In 2013 the newspaper achieved a record period with 51,551 copies circulated. MDA distributed a number of publications including Noseweek and Destiny magazine.

In 2017, Media Development Investment Fund, a New York–based not-for-profit investment fund, announced that it had acquired a majority stake in the Mail & Guardian. The restructured ownership saw the CEO, Hoosain Karjieker, acquire a minority stake in the business as part of a Black Economic Empowerment (BEE) transaction. Staff continue to own a 10% share of the company. The former majority shareholder, Trevor Ncube, disposed of his equity interest.

The newspaper's headquarters are in Johannesburg. The editor-in-chief is Ron Derby and the CEO is Hoosain Karjieker.

== The Mail & Guardian Online ==
In 1994, the Mail & Guardian Online was launched in conjunction with Media24 (a subsidiary of the Naspers group), becoming the first internet news publication in Africa. It has grown into its own daily news operation with a number of writers, multimedia producers, sub-editors and more. It is run out of the Mail & Guardian offices in Rosebank, Johannesburg. The site focuses on local, international and African hard news, sport and business.

The website began its life as the Electronic Mail & Guardian, which was initially an e-mail subscription service that allowed readers living outside South Africa to receive Mail & Guardian newspaper stories before they reached newspaper subscribers. Soon after, the service expanded into a searchable online archive, published in partnership with Sangonet, the country's oldest internet service provider. A website was added, which in turn progressed from producing a weekly mirror of the printed newspaper to generating its own daily news.

The Mail & Guardian Online was jointly owned by internet service provider MWEB and publishing company M&G Media until M&G Media purchased 100% of the operation in 2008.

It has interactive news photo galleries, discussion forums and special reports on subjects such as Zimbabwe, HIV and South African President Jacob Zuma. It is known for hard-hitting political reporting, investigations as well as strong beat reporting, particularly in education, labour, environment and health.

== Awards ==
- 2012: CNN African Journalism award (2012)
- 2012: Standard Bank Sikuvile Journalism Award
- 2011: Vodacom Journalist of the Year
- 2011: Bookmark awards
- 2010: Bookmark awards
- 2008: Webby Awards Honoree for News in Photos and Political Blog
- 2005: Webby Awards Honoree for Web Best Practices
- 2001: Forbes.com voted the Mail & Guardian Online one of the world's top 175 websites
- 1996: Missouri Honor Medal for Distinguished Journalism
- 1995: International Press Directory – Best International Newspaper

== Notable staff and contributors ==
- David Beresford (1993)
- Matthew Buckland
- Eusebius McKaiser
- Verashni Pillay (2009-2017)
- Barry Streek (political journalist 2001)

== Distribution figures ==
Circulation
Period	Net sales
Oct – Dec 2018	25 834
Oct – Dec 2015	33 210
Jun – Aug 2015	30 290
Jan – Mar 2015	30 714
Jan – Mar 2014	44 267
Jan – Mar 2013	45 279
Apr – Jun 2013	42 496
Jul – Sep 2013	42 242
Oct – Dec 2013	51 551

== See also ==
- List of newspapers in South Africa
- Mail & Guardian 200 Young South Africans
