= 1820 Settlers National Monument =

1820 Settlers Monument
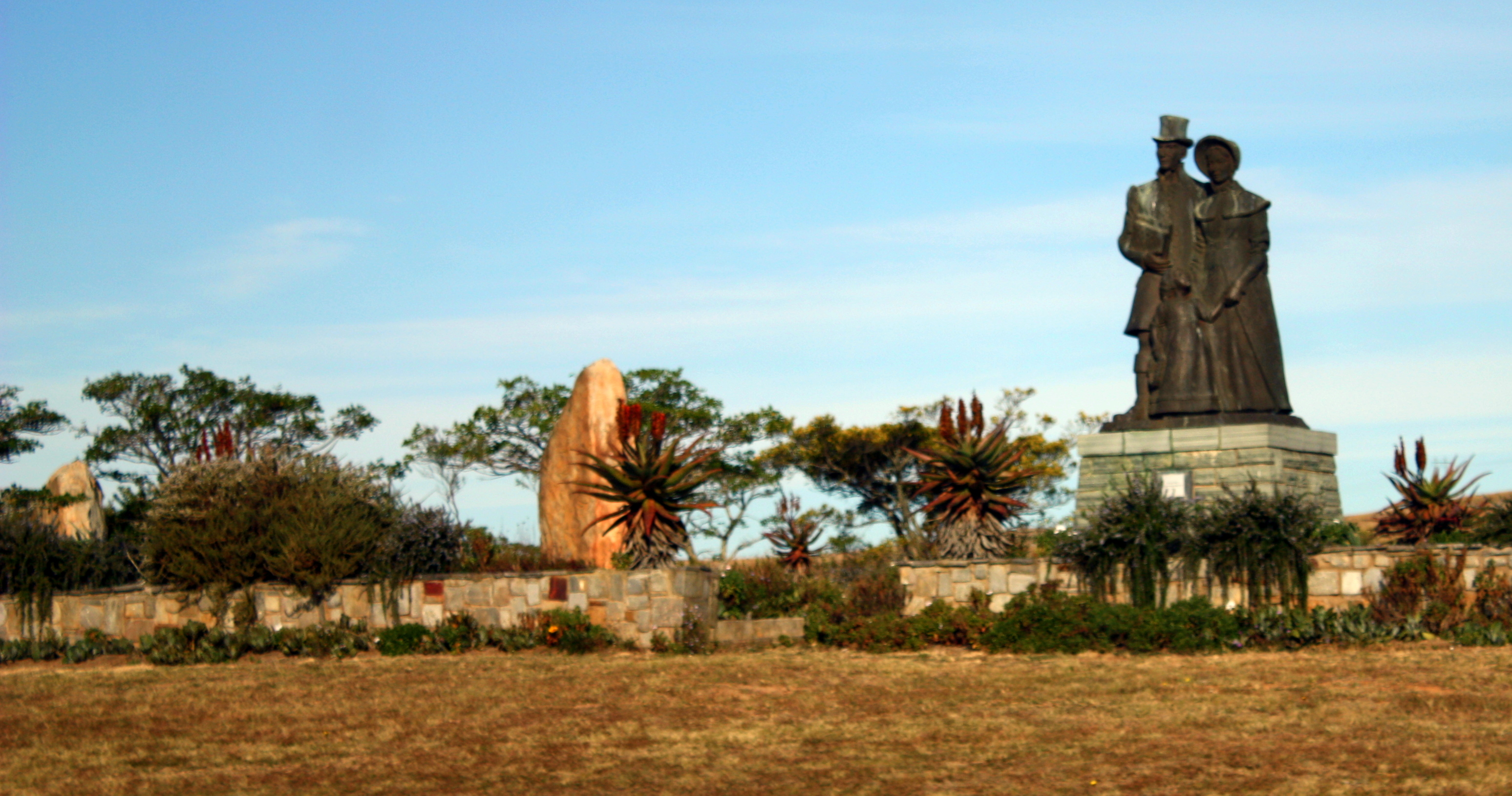

- Location within South Africa
- Interactive map of 1820 Settlers Monument
- Location: Grahamstown, Eastern Cape, South Africa
- Coordinates: 33.31945°S 26.51933°E
- Opening date: 13 July 1974
- Dedicated to: 1820 Settlers

The 1820 Settlers National Monument, which honours the contribution to South African society made by the British 1820 Settlers, overlooks Grahamstown (Makhanda) in the Eastern Cape. It commemorates the Anglo-South Africans, as well as the English language, as much as the settlers themselves. The building was designed by John Sturrock, who was inspired by the work of Louis Kahn. The building was built by Murray and Stewart (EP) Pty Ltd

== National Arts Festival ==
The Monument is closely linked with the National Arts Festival, often known simply as the Grahamstown Festival. Ever since the monument's opening on 13 July 1974, the festival has been held there every year, except for in 1975. Virtually all possible venues in Grahamstown are used during the festival, but the Monument is the anchor of the event and the biggest venue too. The main theatre in the monument complex is named after Guy Butler.

== Fire in 1994 ==
The monument was devastated by a fire in 1994 and rebuilt and was officially re-dedicated by Nelson Mandela in May 1996.

== See also ==
- Rhodes University
- National Arts Festival
