= 1820 Settlers =

British colonists in the Cape Colony

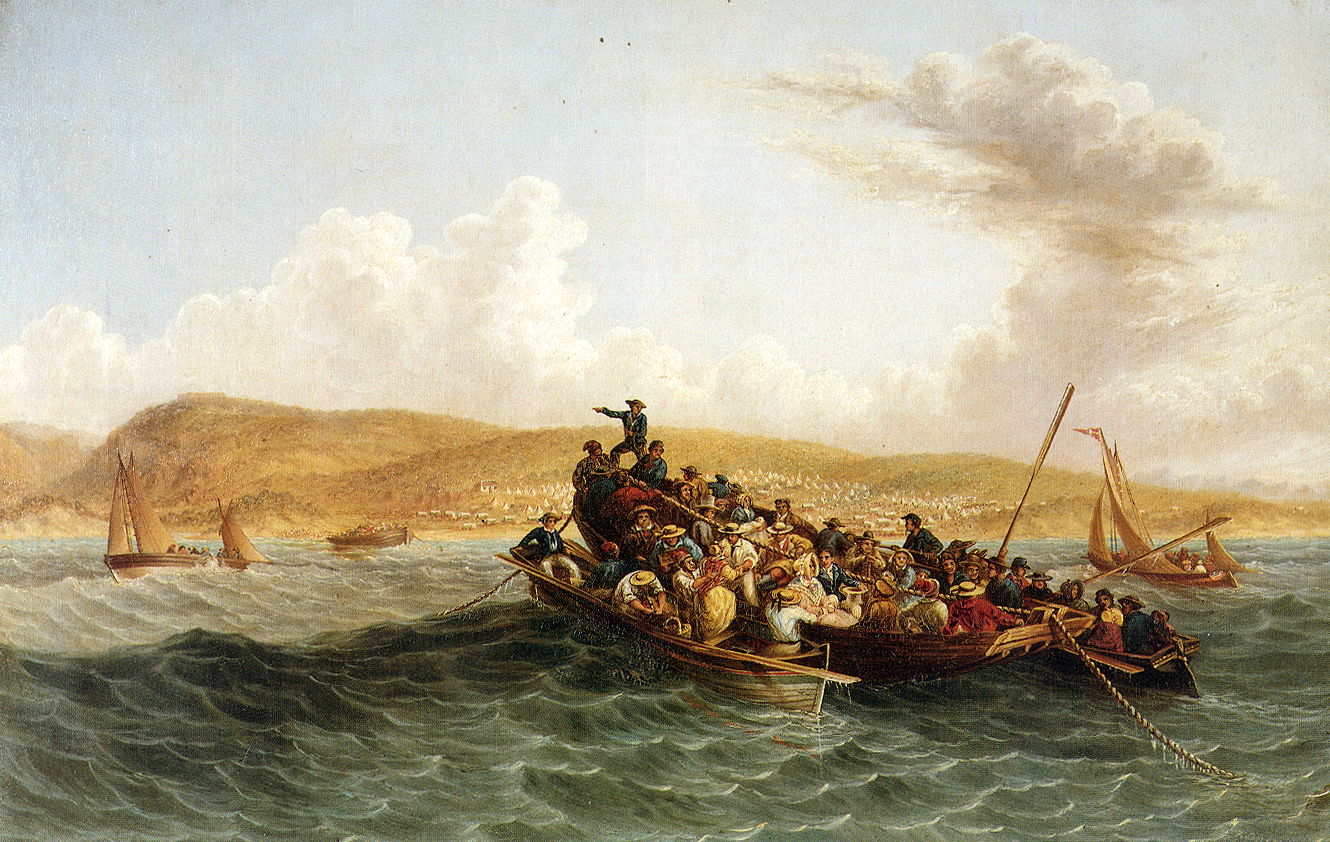
1853 painting of British settlers landing in Algoa Bay in 1820

The 1820 Settlers were several groups of British colonists who settled in the Eastern Cape of the Cape Colony under the auspices of the government of the United Kingdom in 1820.

== Origins ==
After the Napoleonic Wars, Britain experienced a serious unemployment problem. Many of the 1820 Settlers were poor and the Cape government encouraged them to settle in the Eastern Cape in an attempt to strengthen the eastern frontier against the neighbouring Xhosa peoples, and to provide a boost to the English-speaking population of South Africa. The settlement policy led to the establishment of Albany, South Africa, a centre of the British diaspora in Africa.

== Colonisation ==
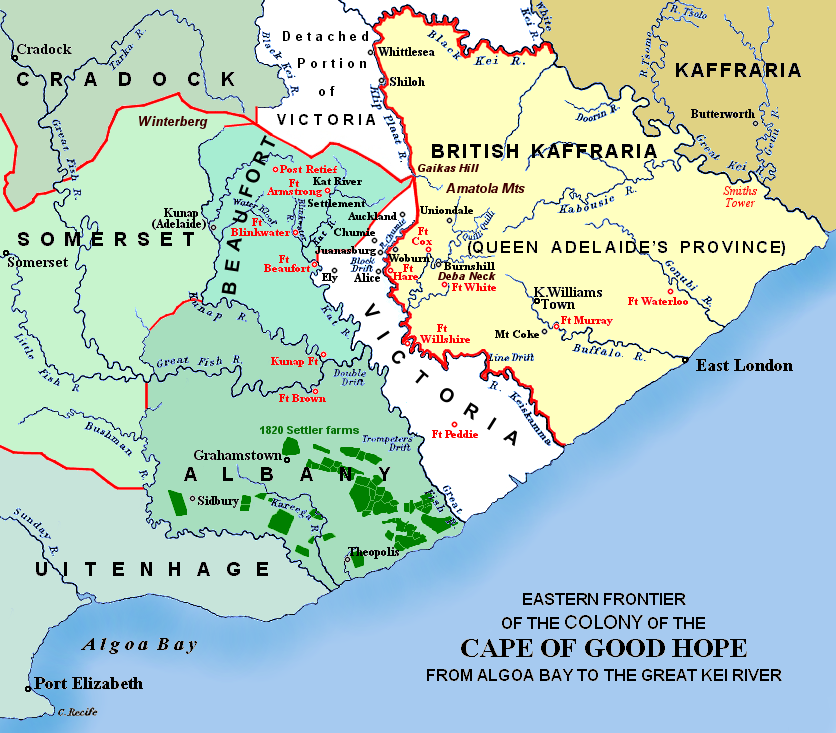
A map of the frontier districts showing settler towns, c. 1835

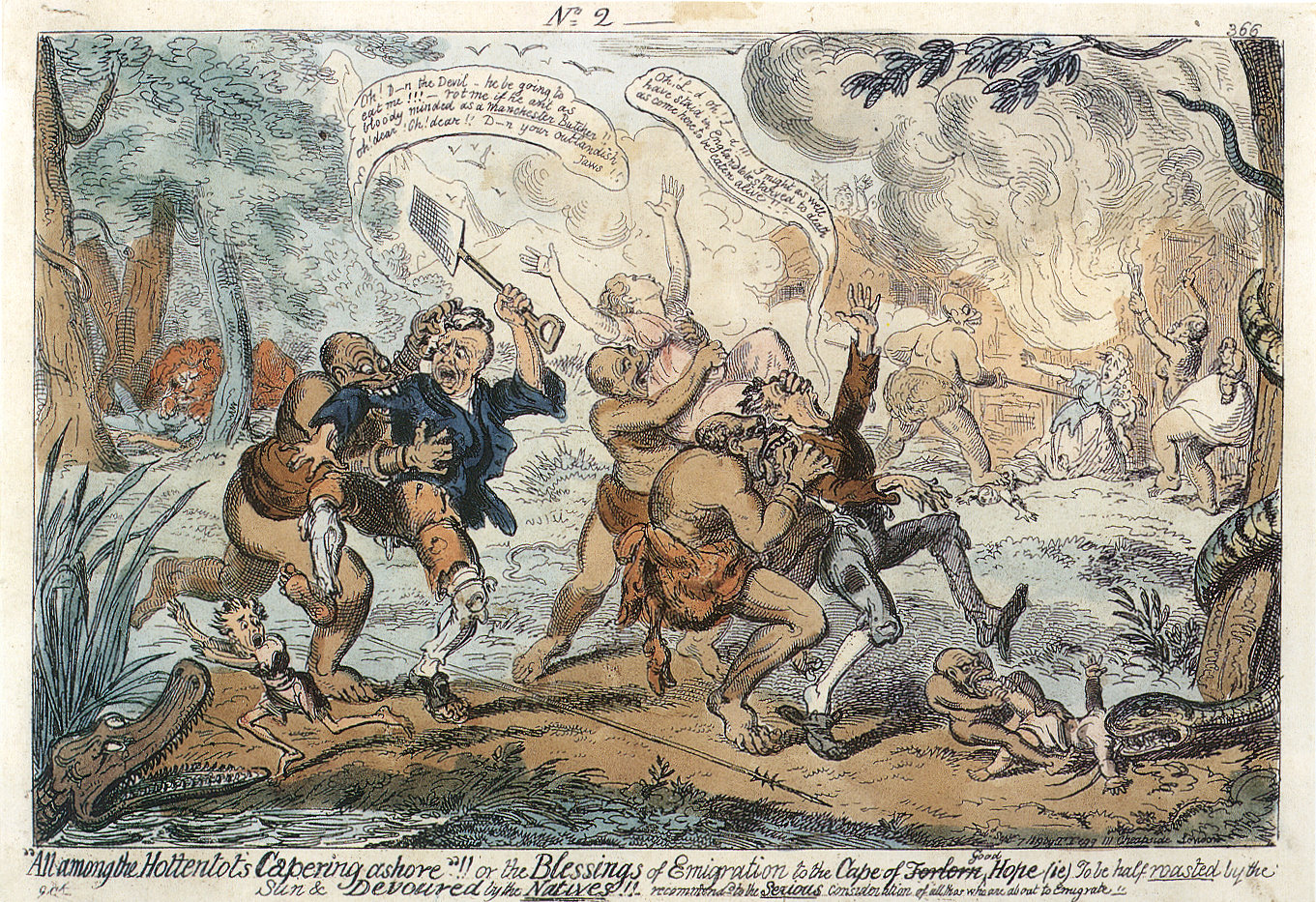
1820 caricature by George Cruikshank showing British settlers being attacked by cannibal "Hottentots"

Of the 90,000 applicants, 19,000 were approved, but only about 4000 could be transported due to financial constraints. Many 1820 Settlers initially arrived in the Cape in about 60 different parties between April and June 1820. They were granted farms near the village of Bathurst, Eastern Cape, and supplied equipment and food against their deposits, but their lack of agricultural experience led many of them to abandon agriculture and withdraw to Bathurst and other settlements like Grahamstown, East London and Port Elizabeth, where they typically reverted to their trades.

A group of the 1820 Settlers continued on to Natal, then a part of Zululand, home of the Zulu people. At the time, King Shaka ruled the territory with highly trained warriors. Leaders of the Natal settlers requested permission from Shaka to stay on the land. When the king witnessed the settlers' technological advances, permission was granted in return for access to firearm technology. According to genealogist Shelagh O'Byrne Spencer, among 1820 Settlers who moved to Natal were "John Bailie, the founder of East London, and Charles Kestell, after whose son, the Rev. John Daniel Kestell of Anglo-Boer War fame, the Free State town of Kestell is named".

As always, there were exceptions. After 5 months at sea two ships arrived at the Cape of Good Hope from London via Cork, Ireland. Upon feasting their eyes on the promised land, about 200 settlers lay off shore at Simonstown ("Simons Bay") for a week, before being sailed back all the way to Saldanha. From here they were carted to Clanwilliam ("Jan Disselsvlei") and given tiny pieces of land. All but 5 families (Archer, Stone, et al.) were later rescued and moved to the "Eastern Cape". The five remaining families, culturally isolated from the other British Settlers, had to make do and were quickly absorbed by the Dutch/Afrikaans speaking communities. Some of their descendants fought against the English in the Anglo Boer wars.

== Memorial ==
They are commemorated in Grahamstown by the 1820 Settlers National Monument, which opened in 1974. A living monument, it hosts plays, musical performances and cultural events, and is supported by the 1820 Settlers Association which was founded in 1920 by Sir Walter Stanford and other descendants. It also served as a vehicle "to [attempt to] reverse the downward trend of British immigration to South Africa and redress the growing numerical imbalance between Afrikaners and English by bringing British immigrants, particularly ex-servicemen, into the country as settlers."

== Notable 1820 Settlers ==
- William Guybon Atherstone
- John Burnet Biddulph
- Alexander Biggar
- Henry Hare Dugmore
- George Henry Ford
- Sir Theophilus Shepstone
- Robert Godlonton
- Dr. Edward Roberts, a surgeon from Albany who moved to the west and was actually, despite what people may think, the person who brought the printing press to South Africa, as seen in the book (British South Africa, 1897)
- Jeremiah Goldswain, an uneducated farmer and former sawyer whose idiosyncratic, phonetically-spelt journal provides insight into early 19th century Midlands English pronunciation
- Richard Gush
- Dick King
- Joshua "Emperor" Norton
- Thomas Pringle
- Thomas Shone
- James Cotterell Hoole

== See also ==
- 1820 Settlers National Monument
- Fort Frederick, Eastern Cape
- Second Boer War
- White Africans
- British diaspora in Africa
