= List of Delosperma species =

Delosperma is a genus of plants in the family Aizoaceae. As of December 2024, Plants of the World Online accepted 170 species.

== A ==
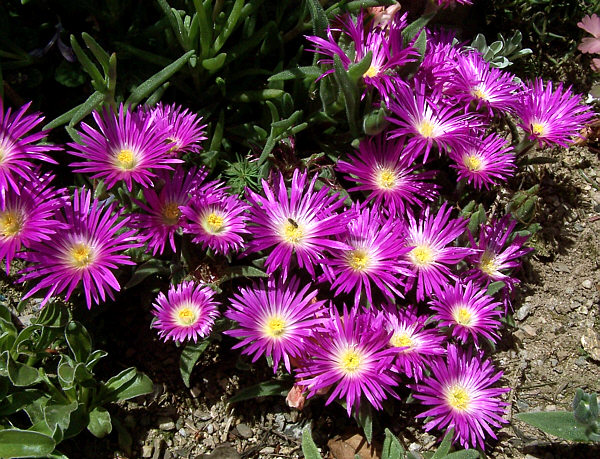
Delosperma ashtonii

- Delosperma abbottii van Jaarsv.
- Delosperma aberdeenense (L.Bolus) L.Bolus
- Delosperma abyssinicum (Regel) Schwantes
- Delosperma acocksii L.Bolus
- Delosperma acuminatum L.Bolus
- Delosperma adamantinum Niederle
- Delosperma adelaidense Lavis
- Delosperma aereum (L.Bolus) L.Bolus
- Delosperma affine Lavis
- Delosperma algoense L.Bolus
- Delosperma aliwalense L.Bolus
- Delosperma alpinum (N.E.Br.) S.A.Hammer & A.P.Dold
- Delosperma alticola L.Bolus
- Delosperma angustifolium L.Bolus
- Delosperma angustipetalum Lavis
- Delosperma annulare L.Bolus
- Delosperma appressum L.Bolus
- Delosperma ashtonii L.Bolus
- Delosperma asperulum (Salm-Dyck) L.Bolus

== B ==
- Delosperma badspoortense (van Jaarsv.) Klak
- Delosperma basuticum L.Bolus
- Delosperma bosserianum Marais
- Delosperma brevipetalum L.Bolus
- Delosperma brevisepalum L.Bolus
- Delosperma britteniae L.Bolus
- Delosperma brunnthaleri (A.Berger) Schwantes ex H.Jacobsen
- Delosperma burtoniae L.Bolus

== C ==
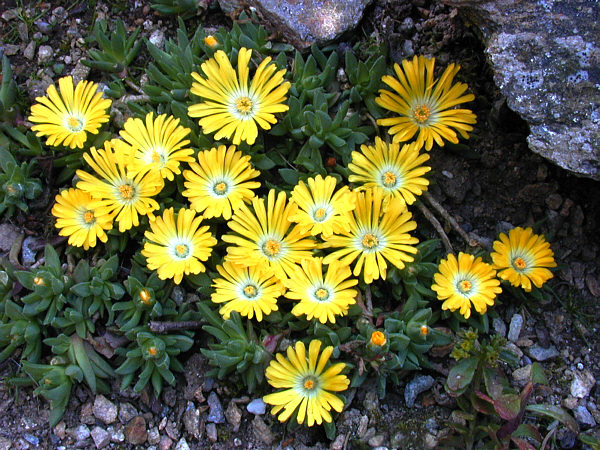
Delosperma congestum

- Delosperma caespitosum L.Bolus
- Delosperma calitzdorpense L.Bolus
- Delosperma calycinum L.Bolus
- Delosperma carolinense N.E.Br.
- Delosperma carterae L.Bolus
- Delosperma clavipes Lavis
- Delosperma cloeteae Lavis
- Delosperma concavum L.Bolus
- Delosperma congestum L.Bolus
- Delosperma cooperi (Hook.f.) L.Bolus
- Delosperma crassuloides (Haw.) L.Bolus
- Delosperma crassum L.Bolus
- Delosperma cronemeyerianum (A.Berger) H.Jacobsen ex H.E.K.Hartmann

== D ==
- Delosperma davyi N.E.Br.
- Delosperma deilanthoides S.A.Hammer
- Delosperma deleeuwiae Lavis
- Delosperma dolomitica van Jaarsv. & A.E.van Wyk
- Delosperma dunense L.Bolus
- Delosperma dyeri L.Bolus

== E ==
- Delosperma echinatum (Lam.) Schwantes
- Delosperma ecklonis (Salm-Dyck) Schwantes
- Delosperma erectum L.Bolus
- Delosperma esterhuyseniae L.Bolus

== F ==
- Delosperma ficksbergense Lavis
- Delosperma floribundum L.Bolus
- Delosperma fredericii Lavis
- Delosperma frutescens L.Bolus

== G ==
- Delosperma galpinii L.Bolus
- Delosperma gautengense H.E.K.Hartmann
- Delosperma gerstneri L.Bolus
- Delosperma giffenii Lavis
- Delosperma gracile L.Bolus
- Delosperma gracillimum L.Bolus
- Delosperma gramineum L.Bolus
- Delosperma grantiae L.Bolus
- Delosperma gratiae L.Bolus
- Delosperma guthriei Lavis

== H ==
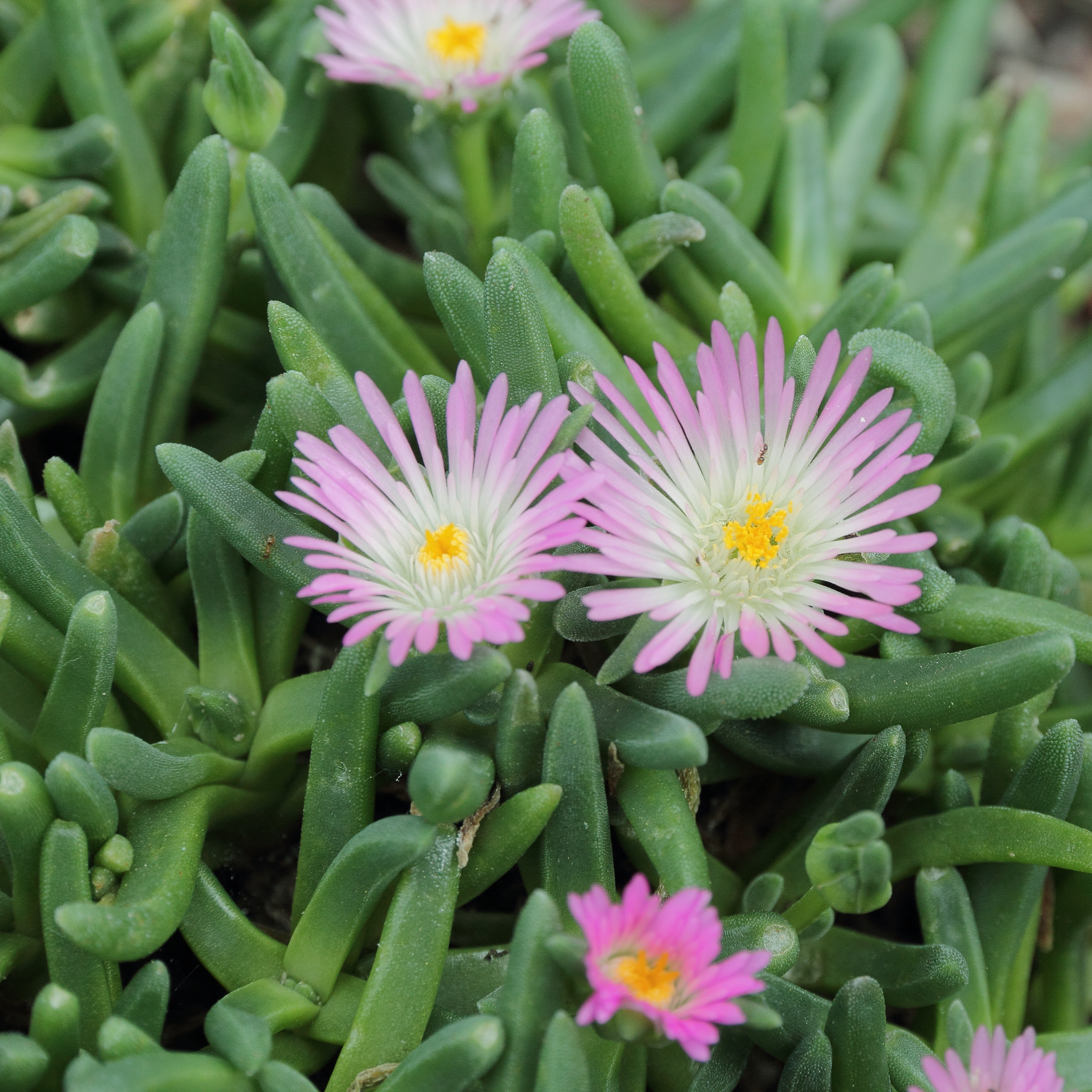
Delosperma harazianum

- Delosperma harazianum (Deflers) Poppend. & Ihlenf.
- Delosperma heidihartmanniae L.E.Newton & Liede
- Delosperma herbeum (N.E.Br.) N.E.Br.
- Delosperma hirtum (N.E.Br.) Schwantes
- Delosperma hollandii L.Bolus
- Delosperma holzbecherorum Niederle

== I ==
- Delosperma imbricatum L.Bolus
- Delosperma inaequale L.Bolus
- Delosperma incomptum (Haw.) L.Bolus
- Delosperma inconspicuum L.Bolus
- Delosperma intonsum L.Bolus
- Delosperma invalidum (N.E.Br.) H.E.K.Hartmann

== J ==
- Delosperma jansei N.E.Br.

== K ==
- Delosperma karrooicum L.Bolus
- Delosperma katbergense L.Bolus
- Delosperma klinghardtianum (Dinter) Dinter & Schwantes
- Delosperma knox-daviesii Lavis
- Delosperma kofleri Lavis

== L ==
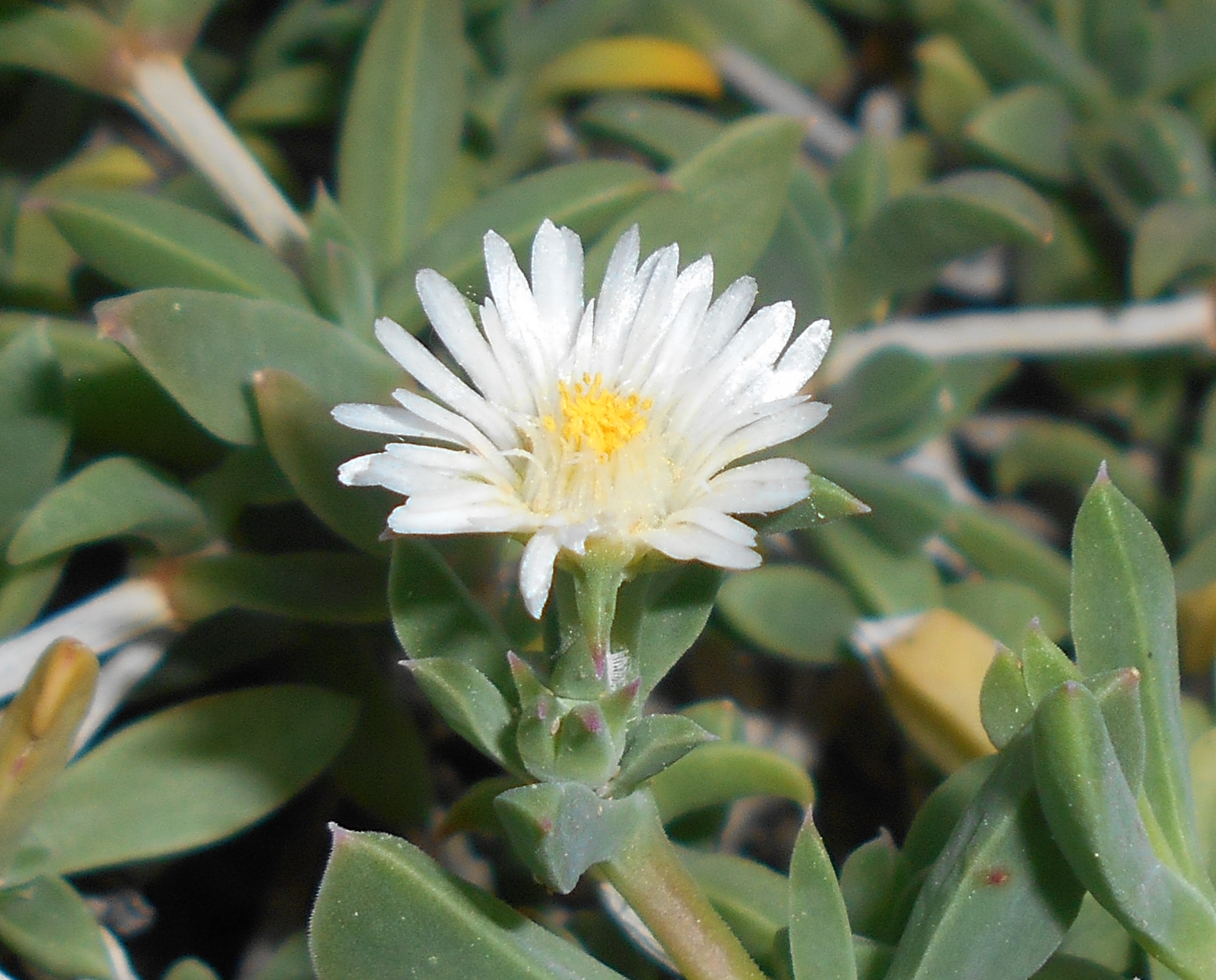
Delosperma litorale

- Delosperma lavisiae L.Bolus
- Delosperma laxipetalum L.Bolus
- Delosperma lebomboense (L.Bolus) Lavis
- Delosperma leendertziae N.E.Br.
- Delosperma lehmannii (Eckl. & Zeyh.) Schwantes ex H.Jacobsen
- Delosperma leightoniae Lavis
- Delosperma liebenbergii L.Bolus
- Delosperma lineare L.Bolus
- Delosperma litorale (Kensit) L.Bolus
- Delosperma lootsbergense Lavis
- Delosperma luckhoffii L.Bolus
- Delosperma luteum L.Bolus
- Delosperma lydenburgense L.Bolus

== M ==
- Delosperma macellum (N.E.Br.) N.E.Br.
- Delosperma macrostigma L.Bolus
- Delosperma mahonii (N.E.Br.) N.E.Br.
- Delosperma mariae L.Bolus
- Delosperma maxwellii L.Bolus
- Delosperma melepoense L.E.Newton & Liede
- Delosperma minimum Lavis
- Delosperma muirii L.Bolus
- Delosperma multiflorum L.Bolus

== N ==
- Delosperma nakurense (Engl.) Herre
- Delosperma napiforme (N.E.Br.) Schwantes
- Delosperma neethlingiae (L.Bolus) Schwantes
- Delosperma nelii L.Bolus
- Delosperma nubigenum (Schltr.) L.Bolus

== O ==
- Delosperma obtusum L.Bolus
- Delosperma oehleri (Engl.) Herre
- Delosperma ornatulum N.E.Br. ex Stapf

== P ==
- Delosperma pachyrhizum L.Bolus
- Delosperma pageanum (L.Bolus) Schwantes
- Delosperma pallidum L.Bolus
- Delosperma parentum Niederle
- Delosperma parviflorum L.Bolus
- Delosperma patersoniae (L.Bolus) L.Bolus
- Delosperma peersii Lavis
- Delosperma peglerae L.Bolus
- Delosperma pilosulum L.Bolus
- Delosperma platysepalum L.Bolus
- Delosperma pondoense L.Bolus
- Delosperma pontii L.Bolus
- Delosperma pottsii (L.Bolus) L.Bolus
- Delosperma prasinum L.Bolus
- Delosperma purpureum H.E.K.Hartmann

== R ==
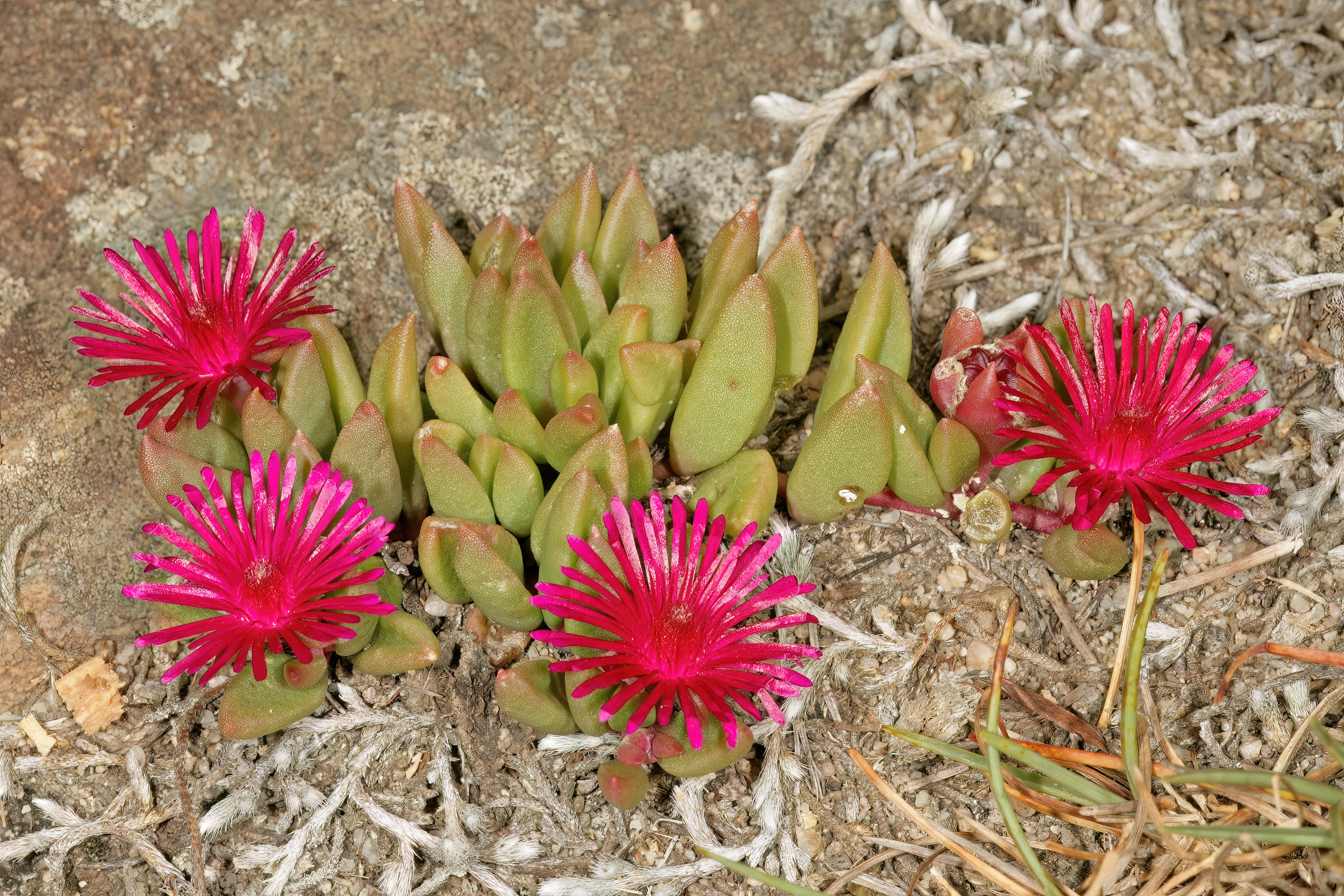
Delosperma repens

- Delosperma repens L.Bolus
- Delosperma reynoldsii Lavis
- Delosperma rileyi L.Bolus
- Delosperma robustum L.Bolus
- Delosperma rogersii (Schönland & A.Berger) L.Bolus
- Delosperma roseopurpureum Lavis

== S ==
- Delosperma saturatum L.Bolus
- Delosperma sawdahense H.E.K.Hartmann
- Delosperma saxicola Lavis
- Delosperma scabripes L.Bolus
- Delosperma schimperi (Engl.) H.E.K.Hartmann & Niesler
- Delosperma seanii-hoganii Niederle
- Delosperma smythae L.Bolus
- Delosperma sphalmanthoides S.A.Hammer
- Delosperma stenandrum L.Bolus
- Delosperma steytlerae L.Bolus
- Delosperma subclavatum L.Bolus
- Delosperma subincanum (Haw.) Schwantes
- Delosperma subpetiolatum L.Bolus
- Delosperma sulcatum L.Bolus
- Delosperma sutherlandii (Hook.f.) N.E.Br.
- Delosperma suttoniae Lavis

== T ==
- Delosperma taylorii (N.E.Br.) Schwantes
- Delosperma testaceum (Haw.) Schwantes
- Delosperma tradescantioides (A.Berger) L.Bolus
- Delosperma truteri Lavis

== U ==
- Delosperma uitenhagense L.Bolus
- Delosperma uncinatum L.Bolus
- Delosperma uniflorum L.Bolus

== V ==
- Delosperma vandermerwei L.Bolus
- Delosperma velutinum L.Bolus
- Delosperma verecundum L.Bolus
- Delosperma vernicolor L.Bolus
- Delosperma versicolor L.Bolus
- Delosperma vinaceum (L.Bolus) L.Bolus
- Delosperma virens L.Bolus

== W ==
- Delosperma waterbergense L.Bolus
- Delosperma wethamae L.Bolus
- Delosperma wilmaniae Lavis
- Delosperma wiumii Lavis

== Z ==
- Delosperma zeederbergii L.Bolus
- Delosperma zoeae L.Bolus
- Delosperma zoutpansbergense L.Bolus
