= Peter MacOwan =

British botanist (1830-1909)

- Born: 14 November 1830; Hull, England
- Died: 30 November 1909 (aged 79); Uitenhage, Cape Province
- Scientific career
- Fields: Botanist
- Author abbrev. (botany): MacOwan

Peter MacOwan was a British colonial botanist and teacher in South Africa.

== Early life and education ==
He was the son of Peter McOwan, a Wesleyan minister from Scotland. After finishing school, he taught at Bath, Colchester, and Leeds, and in 1857 taught chemistry at the Huddersfield College Laboratory. That same year he graduated in chemistry from the University of London, becoming professor of chemistry at Huddersfield.

== Botanical work ==
The year before, he married Amelia Day from Bristol. A severe lung condition, possibly asthma, caused him to move to South Africa and take up the post of principal at the newly established Shaw College in Grahamstown. His health rapidly improved and leaving chemistry behind he resumed studying botany in which he had become interested while still in England, having started a collection of flowers and mosses. This interest was furthered by his association with Dr William Guybon Atherstone, Henry Hutton and Mrs. F. W. Barber. He entered into a fruitful exchange of specimens and correspondence with Asa Gray of the States, Sir William Hooker of Kew and with Harvey and Sonder who were working on the Flora Capensis. Finding it a drain on his own time to supply duplicates to overseas collectors, he formed the South African Botanical Exchange Society, which brought together a large number of amateur botanists. By 1868, roughly 9000 duplicates had been sent abroad, for which in return they received specimens from Europe, North America and Australia. With Harry Bolus he issued the exsiccata Herbarium normale Austro-africanum conflaverunt Macowan & Bolus (1882 - ?1894), followed up by the specimen series Herbarium Austro-africanum continuavit Macowan(1894 - ?1899). His contributions are acknowledged in the introductions to Flora Capensis. He assisted Atherstone and HG Galpin in confirming in 1867 that the Hopetown or Eureka Diamond was indeed a diamond.

Eventually he became head of natural sciences and Rector at Gill College, Somerset East, South Africa and then later director of the Cape Town Botanical Garden. During his time in Cape Town he collated specimens that Henry Flanagan from Kouga sent him. He was also the curator of the Cape Government Herbarium.

Peter MacOwan's daughter Flora married Selmar Schonland in 1896; Peter is the grandfather of Basil Schonland.

Plant pathology as a science in South Africa formally began in 1887 with MacOwan's appointment as the consultant in economic botany to the Cape Government.

== Publications ==
- Pillans, Charles Eustace; MacOwan, Peter (1896). Manual of practical orchardwork at the Cape. Cape Town: W. A. Richards.

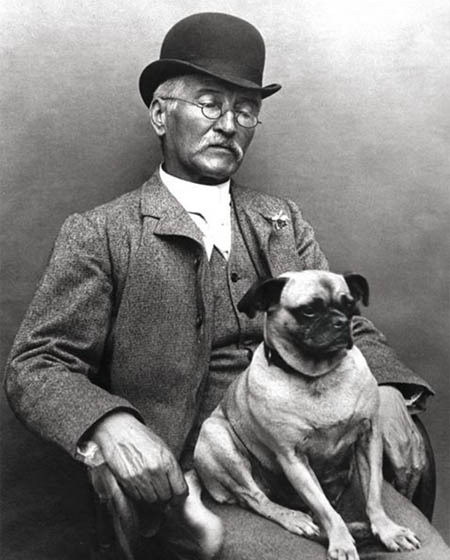

== See also ==
- Harry Bolus – South African artist and botanist (1834–1911)
- Selmar Schonland – South African botanist (1860–1940)
- Ernest Edward Galpin – South African botanist and banker (1858–1941)
- Francis Guthrie – South African mathematician and botanist (1831–1899)
- William John Burchell – English explorer, naturalist, traveller, artist, and author
- Rudolf Marloth – South African botanist, pharmacist and chemist
- John Medley Wood – South African botanist (1827–1915)
- Joseph Burke II – British explorer and naturalist
- Thomas Robertson Sim – South African botanist (1858–1938)
