= Schonland =

Schonland is a surname. Notable people with the surname include:

- Basil Schonland (1896–1972), South African physicist
- Herbert Emery Schonland (1900–1984), United States Navy Medal of Honor recipient
- Selmar Schonland (1860–1940), South African botanist

== See also ==
- Schönland
