= Thembelihle Local Municipality elections =

South African political elections

The Thembelihle Local Municipality council consists of eleven members elected by mixed-member proportional representation. Six councillors are elected by first-past-the-post voting in six wards, while the remaining five are chosen from party lists so that the total number of party representatives is proportional to the number of votes received. In the election of 1 November 2021 the African National Congress (ANC) lost its majority, but remains the largest party, with five seats.

== Results ==
The following table shows the composition of the council after past elections.

| Event | ANC | DA | EFF | Other | Total |
|---|---|---|---|---|---|
| 2000 election | 4 | 3 | — | — | 7 |
| 2006 election | 5 | 2 | — | 0 | 7 |
| 2011 election | 4 | 1 | — | 2 | 7 |
| 2016 election | 4 | 2 | 1 | 0 | 7 |
| 2021 election | 5 | 1 | 3 | 2 | 11 |

== December 2000 election ==
The following table shows the results of the 2000 election.

| Party | Ward | | | List | | | Total seats |
| Party | Votes | % | Seats | Votes | % | Seats | Total seats |
|---|---|---|---|---|---|---|---|
| African National Congress | 2,802 | 61.37 | 2 | 2,808 | 61.28 | 2 | 4 |
| Democratic Alliance | 1,764 | 38.63 | 2 | 1,774 | 38.72 | 1 | 3 |
| Total | 4,566 | 100.00 | 4 | 4,582 | 100.00 | 3 | 7 |
| Valid votes | 4,566 | 98.26 | | 4,582 | 98.45 | | |
| Invalid/blank votes | 81 | 1.74 | | 72 | 1.55 | | |
| Total votes | 4,647 | 100.00 | | 4,654 | 100.00 | | |
| Registered voters/turnout | 6,498 | 71.51 | | 6,498 | 71.62 | | |

== March 2006 election ==
The following table shows the results of the 2006 election.

| Party | Ward | | | List | | | Total seats |
| Party | Votes | % | Seats | Votes | % | Seats | Total seats |
|---|---|---|---|---|---|---|---|
| African National Congress | 2,997 | 69.47 | 4 | 2,985 | 69.15 | 1 | 5 |
| Democratic Alliance | 1,181 | 27.38 | 0 | 1,168 | 27.06 | 2 | 2 |
| Independent Democrats | 136 | 3.15 | 0 | 164 | 3.80 | 0 | 0 |
| Total | 4,314 | 100.00 | 4 | 4,317 | 100.00 | 3 | 7 |
| Valid votes | 4,314 | 95.40 | | 4,317 | 95.47 | | |
| Invalid/blank votes | 208 | 4.60 | | 205 | 4.53 | | |
| Total votes | 4,522 | 100.00 | | 4,522 | 100.00 | | |
| Registered voters/turnout | 7,397 | 61.13 | | 7,397 | 61.13 | | |

== May 2011 election ==
The following table shows the results of the 2011 election.

| Party | Ward | | | List | | | Total seats |
| Party | Votes | % | Seats | Votes | % | Seats | Total seats |
|---|---|---|---|---|---|---|---|
| African National Congress | 3,255 | 55.49 | 4 | 3,300 | 56.18 | 0 | 4 |
| Congress of the People | 1,799 | 30.67 | 0 | 1,744 | 29.69 | 2 | 2 |
| Democratic Alliance | 681 | 11.61 | 0 | 726 | 12.36 | 1 | 1 |
| Freedom Front Plus | 131 | 2.23 | 0 | 104 | 1.77 | 0 | 0 |
| Total | 5,866 | 100.00 | 4 | 5,874 | 100.00 | 3 | 7 |
| Valid votes | 5,866 | 98.95 | | 5,874 | 99.09 | | |
| Invalid/blank votes | 62 | 1.05 | | 54 | 0.91 | | |
| Total votes | 5,928 | 100.00 | | 5,928 | 100.00 | | |
| Registered voters/turnout | 8,454 | 70.12 | | 8,454 | 70.12 | | |

== August 2016 election ==
The following table shows the results of the 2016 election.

| Party | Ward | | | List | | | Total seats |
| Party | Votes | % | Seats | Votes | % | Seats | Total seats |
|---|---|---|---|---|---|---|---|
| African National Congress | 3,111 | 54.81 | 4 | 3,120 | 55.03 | 0 | 4 |
| Democratic Alliance | 1,265 | 22.29 | 0 | 1,328 | 23.42 | 2 | 2 |
| Economic Freedom Fighters | 641 | 11.29 | 0 | 660 | 11.64 | 1 | 1 |
| Congress of the People | 267 | 4.70 | 0 | 311 | 5.49 | 0 | 0 |
| Freedom Front Plus | 215 | 3.79 | 0 | 216 | 3.81 | 0 | 0 |
| Independent candidates | 146 | 2.57 | 0 | | | | 0 |
| Khoisan Revolution | 31 | 0.55 | 0 | 35 | 0.62 | 0 | 0 |
| Total | 5,676 | 100.00 | 4 | 5,670 | 100.00 | 3 | 7 |
| Valid votes | 5,676 | 98.34 | | 5,670 | 97.62 | | |
| Invalid/blank votes | 96 | 1.66 | | 138 | 2.38 | | |
| Total votes | 5,772 | 100.00 | | 5,808 | 100.00 | | |
| Registered voters/turnout | 8,874 | 65.04 | | 8,874 | 65.45 | | |

== November 2021 election ==
The following table shows the results of the 2021 election.

| Party | Ward | | | List | | | Total seats |
| Party | Votes | % | Seats | Votes | % | Seats | Total seats |
|---|---|---|---|---|---|---|---|
| African National Congress | 2,186 | 40.00 | 4 | 2,157 | 39.63 | 1 | 5 |
| Economic Freedom Fighters | 1,315 | 24.06 | 1 | 1,362 | 25.02 | 2 | 3 |
| Democratic Alliance | 627 | 11.47 | 0 | 705 | 12.95 | 1 | 1 |
| Freedom Front Plus | 551 | 10.08 | 1 | 470 | 8.63 | 0 | 1 |
| Siyathemba Community Movement | 152 | 2.78 | 0 | 557 | 10.23 | 1 | 1 |
| Independent candidates | 462 | 8.45 | 0 | | | | 0 |
| Patriotic Alliance | 103 | 1.88 | 0 | 117 | 2.15 | 0 | 0 |
| African Christian Democratic Party | 69 | 1.26 | 0 | 75 | 1.38 | 0 | 0 |
| Total | 5,465 | 100.00 | 6 | 5,443 | 100.00 | 5 | 11 |
| Valid votes | 5,465 | 98.36 | | 5,443 | 98.44 | | |
| Invalid/blank votes | 91 | 1.64 | | 86 | 1.56 | | |
| Total votes | 5,556 | 100.00 | | 5,529 | 100.00 | | |
| Registered voters/turnout | 9,386 | 59.19 | | 9,386 | 58.91 | | |
