= Strydenburg =

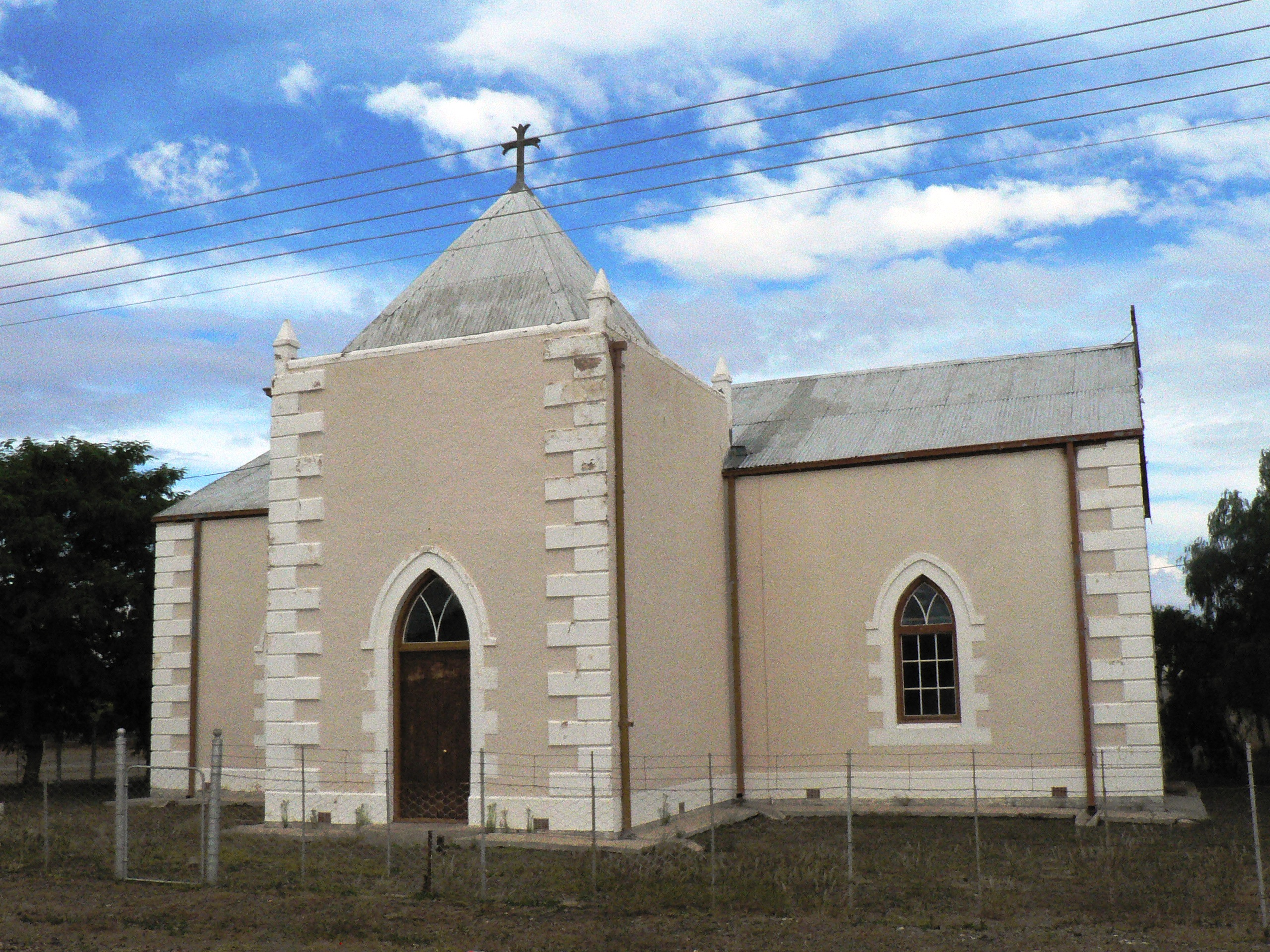
- Reformed Church, Strydenburg

- Location within Northern Cape Location within South Africa
- Coordinates: 29°56′S 23°40′E
- Country: South Africa
- Province: Northern Cape
- District: Pixley ka Seme
- Municipality: Thembelihle

Area
  - Total: 37.98 km^{2} (14.66 sq mi)

Population (2011)
  - Total: 2,987
  - Density: 78.65/km^{2} (203.7/sq mi)

Racial makeup (2011)
  - Black African: 10.2%
  - Coloured: 83.9%
  - Indian/Asian: 0.3%
  - White: 5.2%
  - Other: 0.4%

First languages (2011)
  - Afrikaans: 93.5%
  - Xhosa: 1.7%
  - English: 1.6%
  - Tswana: 1.2%
  - Other: 2.0%
- Time zone: UTC+2 (SAST)
- Postal code (street): 8765
- PO box: 8765
- Area code: 053

Strydenburg is a town in the east of the Northern Cape province in South Africa. Seventy-seven km north of Britstown, it was laid out by the Dutch Reformed Church on the farm Roodepan in 1892. It also lies on the N12, which separates the actual town from its township.

The town is 55 km south-west of Hopetown and 75 km north-north-west of Britstown. It was laid out in 1892 on the farm Roodepan and attained municipal status in 1914. The name is Dutch for ‘town of argument’. The name refers to disagreement as to on which farm it should be situated.
