= Guybon Atherstone =

South African railway engineer

Guybon Damant Atherstone M. Inst. C.E. ACK
- Born: June 20, 1843; Grahamstown
- Died: February 15, 1912 (aged 68); Grahamstown
- Occupation: Engineer
- Known for: Designing and building the railways of the Eastern Cape

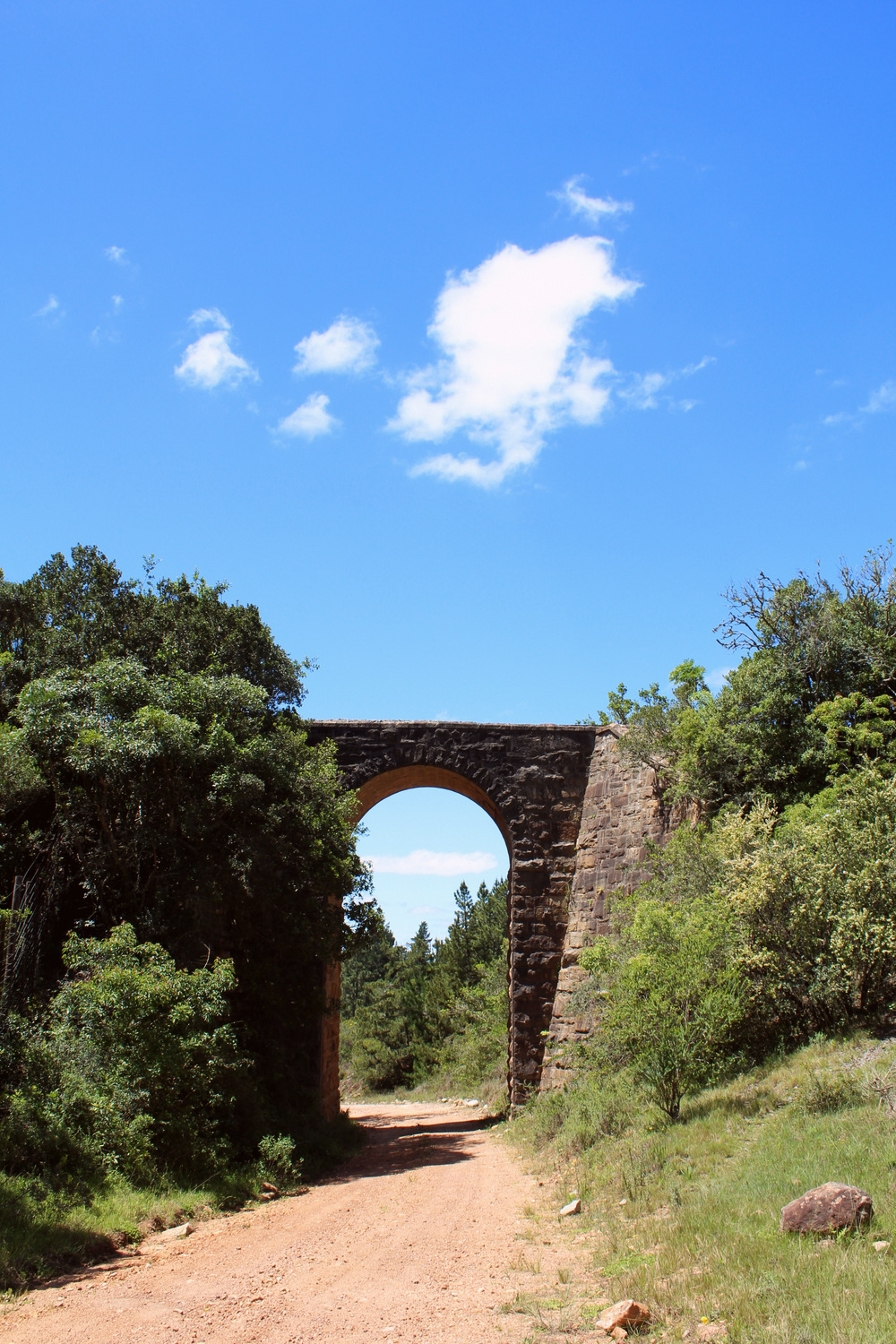
Railway bridge built by Guybon Atherstone on the line between Alicedale and Grahamstown

Guybon Damant Atherstone M. Inst. C.E. AKC (1843–1912), South African railway engineer.

== Education ==
Atherstone was the son of William Guybon Atherstone (medical practitioner, naturalist, geologist and MP) and was born in Grahamstown on 20 June 1843, he attended St. Andrew's College, Grahamstown and King's College London where he qualified as a civil engineer.

== Railway engineering ==
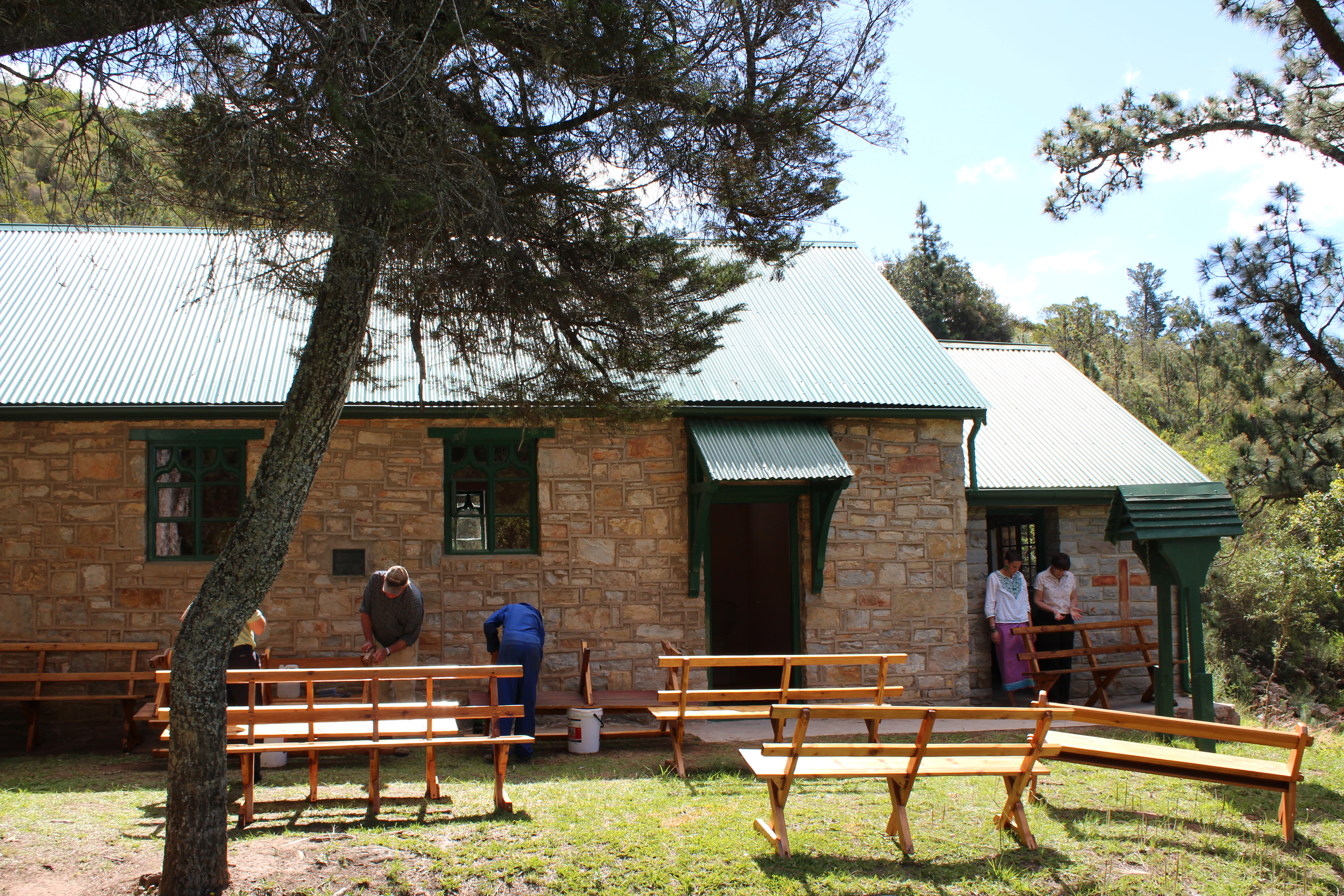
The Anglican church on the Highlands road between Grahamstown and Alicedale

Atherstone was employed at the Cape Government Railways as an engineer from 1873 to 1896 during which he built the railway line between Alicedale and Grahamstown. The house in which he lived during the construction is adjacent to a stone arch railway bridge which he built. On completion of the railway project Atherstone's house was converted into an Anglican church, St. Cyprians Anglican Church, which was dedicated on 29 November 1893. This church is part of the Diocese of Grahamstown and is located at 33°20′07″S 26°18′51″E. Atherstone is also remembered in the naming of the Atherstone railway siding on that line, the siding is located at 33°18′52″S 26°22′23″E.

== Notes and references ==
- Wills, Walter H. (2006). The Anglo-African Who's Who and Biographical Sketchbook, 1907. Jeppestown Press. ISBN 978-0-9553936-3-1.
- Damant, Derek George (1983). The Damants and their party: the 1820 settlers from Norfolk. George Print. Co. ISBN 9780620075053.
- Van der Riet, E.G. (1978). Dr W.G. Atherstone. Friends of the University of the Witwatersrand Library. ISBN 978-0-85494-526-9 – via Bibliophilia Africana III: Being the Proceedings of the Third South African Conference of Bibliophiles, Held at the Witwatersrand Library, Johannesburg, May 2–5, 1978.
- Laurie, K. W. J. (1914). Register of S. Andrew's College, Grahamstown, from 1855 to 1914. Grahamstown: Slater & Co.
- "Eastern Cape, ALBANY district, Highlands, St Cyprians Anglican Church, cemetery". eggsa.org. 24 June 2006.
- Biography of Guybon Atherstone at the S2A3 Biographical Database of Southern African Science
