= Florence Mary Paterson =

South African plant collector

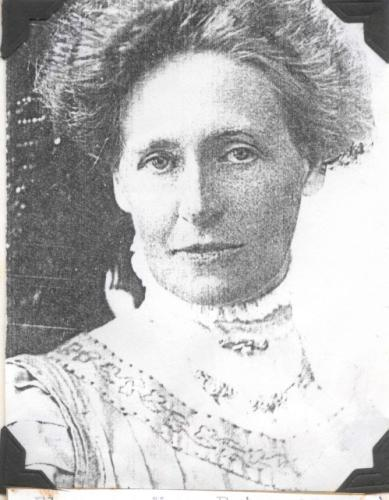
- Born: Florence Mary Hallack; 15 July 1869; Port Elizabeth, Cape Colony
- Died: 5 June 1936 (aged 66); Redhouse, South Africa
- Occupation: plant collector

Florence Mary Paterson, née Hallack, also known as Mrs. T.V. Paterson, (15 July, 1869, Port Elizabeth – 5 June, 1936, Redhouse) was a South African plant collector. Her specimens are kept in the herbarium of Albany Museum and the Bolus Herbarium of the University of Cape Town. She is honored in the plant name patersoniae and genus name Neopatersonia.

== Early life ==
Florence Mary Hallack was born on 15 July, 1869 in Port Elizabeth to English businessman and amateur botanist Russell Hallack and his wife Sarah, née Geard. She was the youngest of the nine children in the family. Hallack was encouraged by her father to observe the local flora and learn natural history. In 1895, Hallack married to Thomas Vernon Paterson of Redhouse.

== Career ==
After marriage Paterson made a comprehensive collection of the flora of Port Elizabeth and Uitenhage area. Specimens from her collections had not been seen since Karl Ludwig Phillip Zeyher collected in that area in 1838. Paterson sent her specimens mainly to the professor of botany at Rhodes University and curator (later director) of the Albany Museum, Selmar Schönland. Paterson presented the first batch of specimens in 1908, followed by over 500 specimens in 1909. All her specimens were in a good condition, including undescribed species, and became a valuable addition to the museum's herbarium.

In 1910 Paterson donated the Albany Museum plants from Port Alfred, Steytlervill and Cape Town, and in 1912 plants from Hanover, Uniondale, Natal and the Transvaal.

In 1920s Paterson assisted the botanist Edith Stephens of South African College, collecting specimens of the region's stonecrop family, the charophytes.

Florence Mary Paterson died on 5 June 1936 in Redhouse.

== Honors ==
Schönland named the genus Neopatersonia (Fam. Liliaceae) after Paterson in 1912. He also mentioned Paterson's contribution to collecting rare specimens in his letter to Sir David Prain in 1909, and specifically thanked her in Volume 1 of his Memoirs of the Botanical Survey of South Africa (1919).

Harry Bolus also thanked Paterson for collecting specimens in his Volume 3 of Orchids of South Africa (1913).
