= William Guybon Atherstone =

South African geologist (1814–1898)

William Guybon Atherstone FRCS FGS
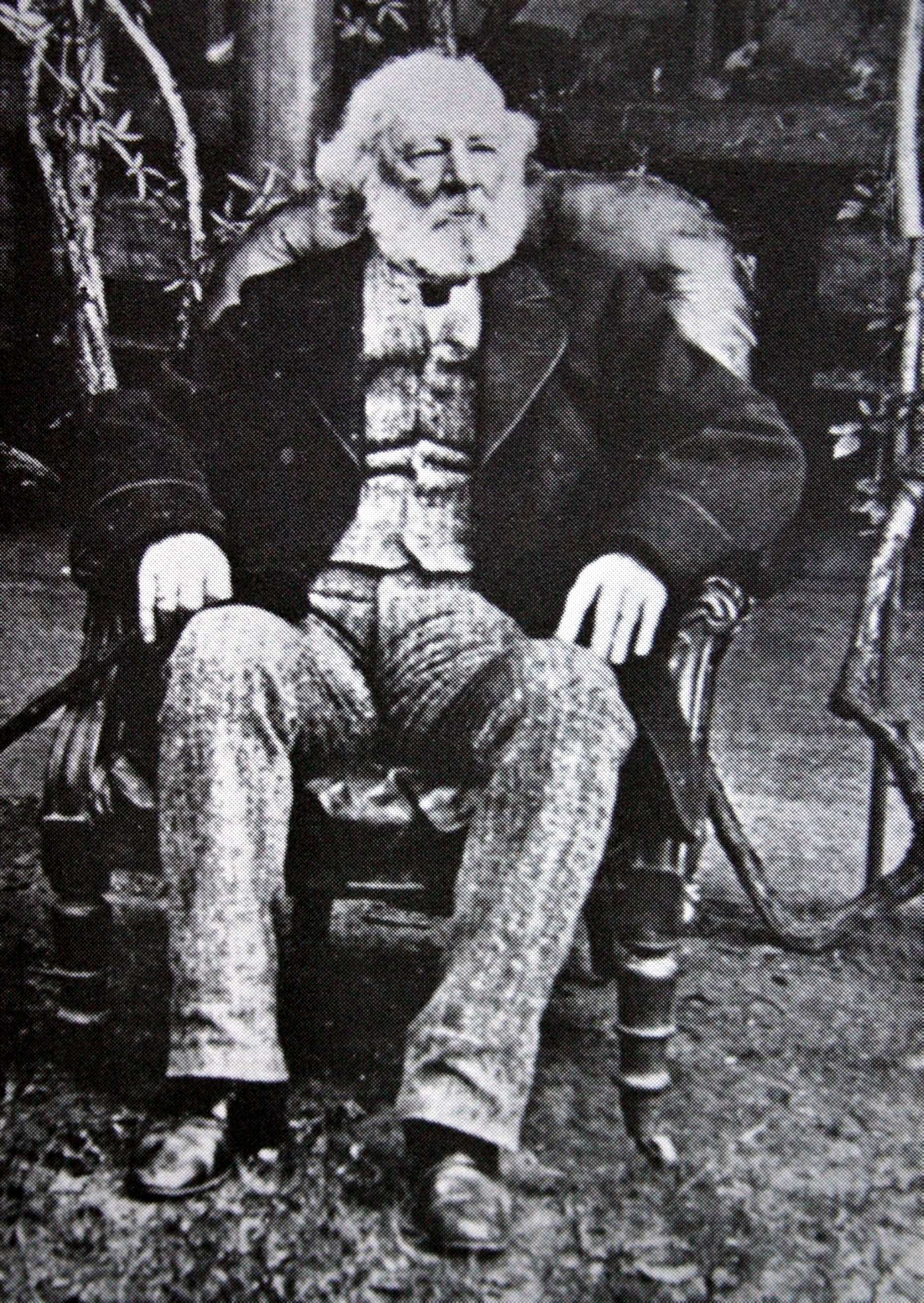
- Born: 27 May 1814; Nottingham, England
- Died: 26 March 1898 (aged 83); Grahamstown, Cape Colony
- Occupations: Medical practitioner, naturalist, geologist

William Guybon Atherstone (/ˈæθərstoʊn/; 1814–1898) was a medical practitioner, naturalist and geologist, one of the pioneers of South African geology and a member of the Cape Parliament.

== Life ==
He arrived in South Africa with his parents as 1820 Settlers. His father, Dr John Atherstone, was appointed District Surgeon of Uitenhage in 1822. William, a young man of wide interests and outstanding ability, received his first training at Dr James Rose Innes's academy in Uitenhage, being at first apprenticed to his father and then serving as Assistant-Surgeon in the Sixth Frontier War 1834–1835. In 1836 he studied medicine in Dublin and was admitted as M.R.C.S. the following year, obtaining an MD in Heidelberg, Germany in 1839, returning to Grahamstown in the same year and joining his father in practice. He carried out research in lung-sickness, horse-sickness and tick-borne fever and was in 1847 the first surgeon outside Europe and America to perform an amputation using an anaesthetic. This operation, on 16 June 1847, was performed on the Albany Deputy Sheriff, Mr F Carlisle, and was completely successful. On recovering from the anaesthetic, the patient said "What? My leg is off? Impossible - I can't believe it!....It's the greatest discovery ever made". In 1839 his interest was aroused in geology, and from that date he devoted the leisure resulting from a long and successful medical career to the pursuit of geological science.

In 1857 he published an account of the rocks and fossils of Uitenhage. He also studied many fossil reptilia from the Karroo beds, and sent specimens to the British Museum. These were described by Sir Richard Owen.

Atherstone's identification, in 1867, with the help of Peter MacOwan and HG Galpin, of a crystal found at De Kalk near Hopetown, as the Eureka Diamond - the first found in Africa - led indirectly to the establishment of the diamond industry of South Africa. He encouraged the workings at Jagersfontein, and he also called attention to the diamandiferous pipe at Kimberley. He was partly responsible for the foundation of the Grahamstown library, botanical garden and, in 1855, the Albany Museum.

He traveled widely in the eastern Cape, Namaqualand and the Transvaal, collecting minerals, fossils, plant specimens and seeds, sending material to Hooker at Kew. He was a friend of Andrew Geddes Bain of pass-building fame. He was made F.R.C.S. in 1863 and F.G.S in 1864. He represented Grahamstown as Member of Parliament from 1881 to 1883 whence he was elected to the Legislative Council where he served until 1891.

He is commemorated in the genus Atherstonea Pappe and in the names of various fossil reptiles. He was one of the founders of the Geological Society of South Africa at Johannesburg in 1895. He died at Grahamstown, on 26 June 1898.

== Family ==
- father: John Atherstone *25 January 1793 Nottingham, England. He died in 1853 at Table Farm, Grahamstown
- mother: Elizabeth Damant *c1785. She died at Table Farm, Grahamstown She married John Atherstone in 1811 in St John's, Westminster, London, England.
- siblings:
1. John Craddock Atherstone.
2. William Guybon Atherstone
3. Catherine Damant Atherstone
4. Elizabeth Atherstone was born in 1817.
5. Emily Atherstone
6. John Frederick Korsten Atherstone
7. Bliss Ann Atherstone
8. Caroline Atherstone

His son was the railway engineer Guybon Atherstone.
