= Eureka Diamond =

First diamond discovered in South Africa

Coordinates: 28.738237°S 24.754727°E

- Weight: 10.73 carats (2.146 g)
- Color: brownish yellow
- Cut: Cushion-shaped brilliant
- Country of origin: Cape Colony
- Discovered: 1867
- Original owner: Erasmus Jacobs
- Owner: The people of South Africa

The Eureka Diamond was the first diamond discovered in South Africa. It originally weighed 21.25 carats (4.250 g), and was later cut to a 10.73-carat (2.146 g) cushion-shaped brilliant, which is currently on display at the Mine Museum in Kimberley. The discovery of diamonds in South Africa led to the Kimberley Diamond Rush, and marked the beginning of the Mineral Revolution.

== Discovery and identification ==
The Eureka Diamond was found near Hopetown on the Orange River by a 15-year-old boy named Erasmus Stephanus Jacobs in 1867. Soon afterward, Schalk Van Niekerk entrusted the stone to John O'Reilly, who took it to Colesberg to inquire as to its nature and value. The stone came under the view of the acting Civil Commissioner Lorenzo Boyes, who on seeing that the stone cut glass declared: "I believe it to be a diamond." The stone was then sent by mail in an ordinary paper envelope to Dr. William Guybon Atherstone, the colony's foremost mineralogist, in Grahamstown. Atherstone confirmed that it was a 21.25 carat (4.250 g) diamond (although some sources put the weight at 24.00 carats (4.800 g)).

== First purchase to current time ==
The Eureka was put on display at the 1867 Paris Exhibition, although some sources claim that this was a glass replica, and that the real diamond was sent on to Windsor for inspection by Queen Victoria. On its return to South Africa, the Eureka was bought for £500 by the Governor of the Cape Colony, Sir Philip Wodehouse. Sir Philip took it with him to the United Kingdom, where it remained for 100 years, during which time it was cut. On 16 April 1946, the Eureka was sold in London at a Christie's public auction as part of a bangle, for £5,700. In 1967, 100 years after the diamond's discovery, De Beers purchased the diamond and donated it to the South African people. The diamond was placed in the Kimberley Mine Museum, where it is currently on display.

== See also ==
- List of diamonds
