= Delosperma rogersii =

Scientific classification
- Kingdom: Plantae
- Clade: Tracheophytes
- Clade: Angiosperms
- Clade: Eudicots
- Order: Caryophyllales
- Family: Aizoaceae
- Genus: Delosperma
- Species: D. rogersii

Binomial name
- Delosperma rogersii (Schönland & A.Berger) L.Bolus

Synonyms
- Delosperma edwardsiae L.Bolus; Mesembryanthemum rogersii Schönland & A.Berger

Species of flowering plant

Delosperma rogersii, commonly known as the mountain vygie, is a perennial succulent belonging to the Aizoaceae family. The species is endemic to the Eastern Cape.
