= Delosperma zoutpansbergense =

Conservation status
- Least Concern (SANBI Red List)

Scientific classification
- Kingdom: Plantae
- Clade: Tracheophytes
- Clade: Angiosperms
- Clade: Eudicots
- Order: Caryophyllales
- Family: Aizoaceae
- Genus: Delosperma
- Species: D. zoutpansbergense

Binomial name
- Delosperma zoutpansbergense L.Bolus

Species of plant

Delosperma zoutpansbergense, commonly known as the Soutpansberg sheepfig, is a perennial succulent belonging to the Aizoaceae family. The species is endemic to Limpopo.
