= Delosperma crassum =

Scientific classification
- Kingdom: Plantae
- Clade: Tracheophytes
- Clade: Angiosperms
- Clade: Eudicots
- Order: Caryophyllales
- Family: Aizoaceae
- Genus: Delosperma
- Species: D. crassum

Binomial name
- Delosperma crassum L.Bolus

Species of flowering plant

Delosperma crassum is a perennial succulent belonging to the Aizoaceae family. The species is endemic to the Western Cape.
