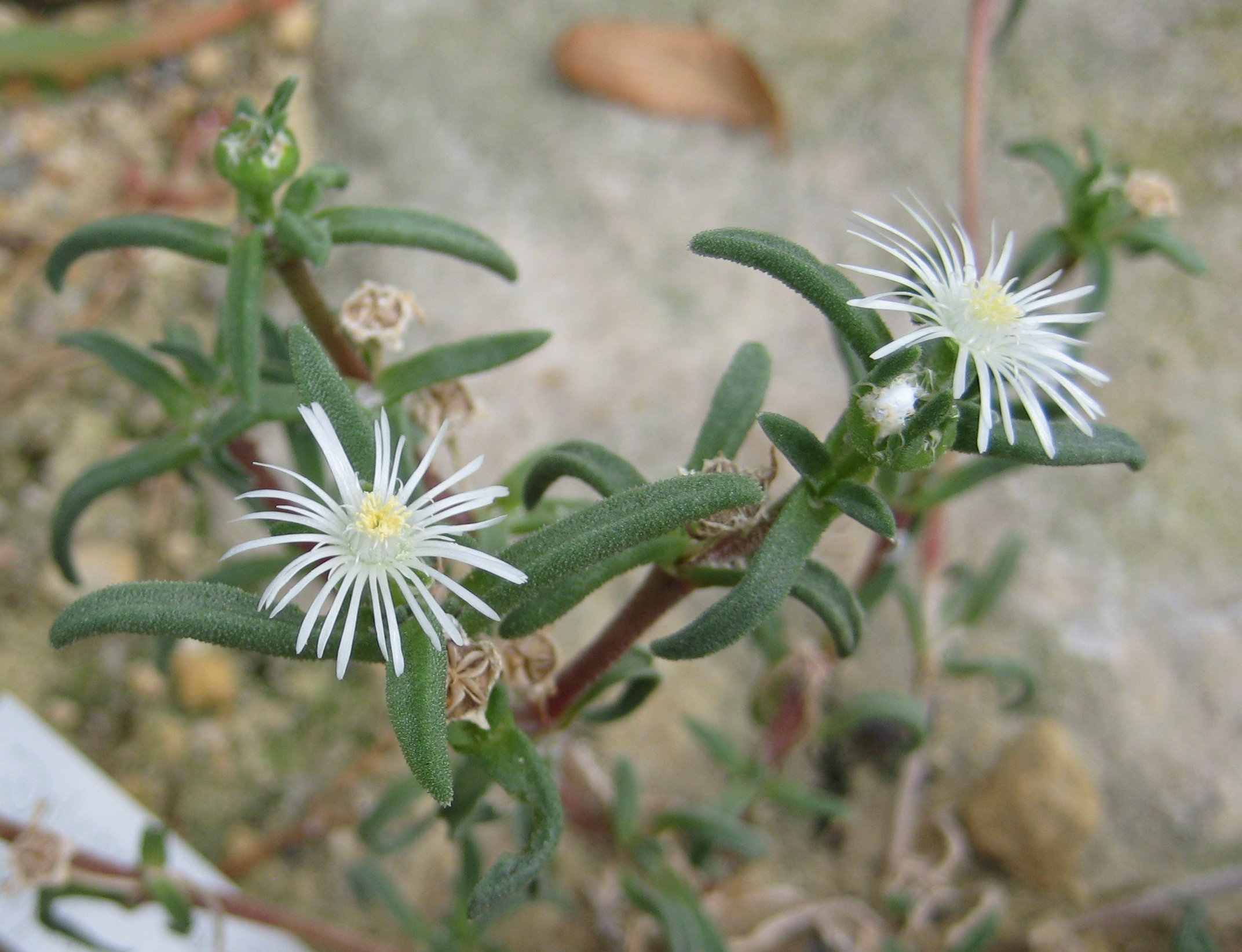

Scientific classification
- Kingdom: Plantae
- Clade: Tracheophytes
- Clade: Angiosperms
- Clade: Eudicots
- Order: Caryophyllales
- Family: Aizoaceae
- Genus: Delosperma
- Species: D. steytlerae

Binomial name
- Delosperma steytlerae L.Bolus

= Delosperma steytlerae =

Species of flowering plant

Delosperma steytlerae is a small plant in the Aizoaceae family that is endemic to Zimbabwe. It is listed as vulnerable on Zimbabwe's Red List.

This small succulent grows to a height of 15 cm and has small leaves 2–4.5 cm long and small white flowers. It occurs on granite outcrops in south-central Zimbabwe and in the Penhalonga-Nyanga area, extending from Nyanga to the Limpopo escarpment.
