= Delosperma sphalmanthoides =

Scientific classification
- Kingdom: Plantae
- Clade: Tracheophytes
- Clade: Angiosperms
- Clade: Eudicots
- Order: Caryophyllales
- Family: Aizoaceae
- Genus: Delosperma
- Species: D. sphalmanthoides

Binomial name
- Delosperma sphalmanthoides S.A.Hammer

Synonyms
- Daggodora sphalmanthoides (S.A.Hammer) S.A.Hammer; Komsbergella sphalmanthoides (S.A.Hammer) Niederle

Species of flowering plant

Delosperma sphalmanthoides, commonly known as the tufted ice plant dwarf sea anemone or notchleaf ice plant, is a perennial succulent belonging to the Aizoaceae family. The species is endemic to the Northern Cape and occurs on the Roggeveld Mountains escarpment near Sutherland. The plant has an extent of occurrence of 56 km² and comprises up to three subpopulations. The species grows in shallow soil atop rocks, which protects it from crop cultivation; however, it is threatened by overgrazing and trampling by livestock.
