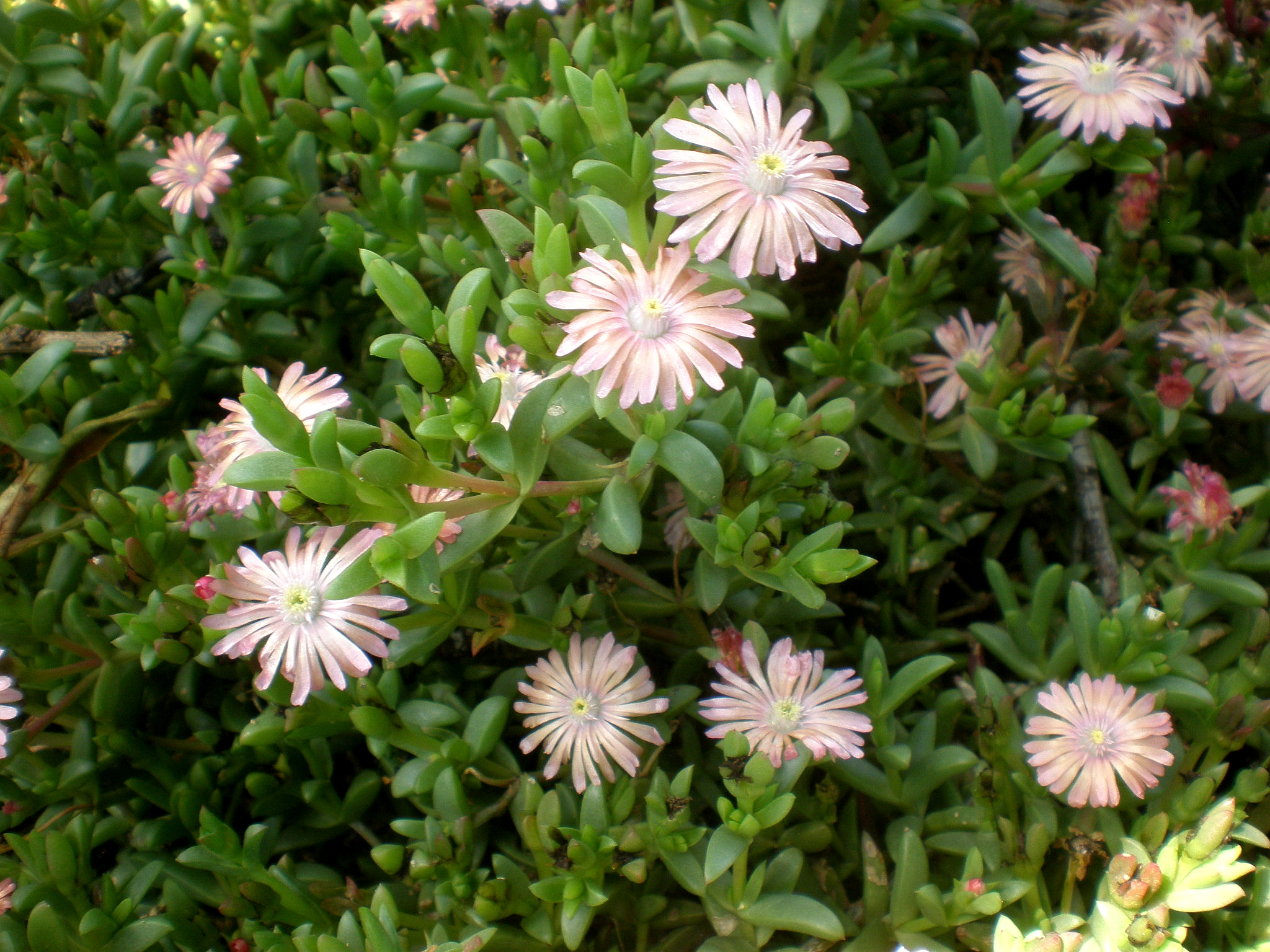

Scientific classification
- Kingdom: Plantae
- Clade: Tracheophytes
- Clade: Angiosperms
- Clade: Eudicots
- Order: Caryophyllales
- Family: Aizoaceae
- Genus: Delosperma
- Species: D. rileyi

Binomial name
- Delosperma rileyi L.Bolus

= Delosperma rileyi =

Species of flowering plant

Delosperma rileyi is a perennial succulent belonging to the Aizoaceae family. The species is endemic to the Limpopo and Mpumalanga provinces.
