= Diamond Rush =

2006 video game

- Developer: Gameloft
- Publisher: Gameloft
- Platforms: Java ME; BlackBerry
- Release: Java ME; 1 December 2006; BlackBerry; 12 March 2009
- Genres: Action; Puzzle
- Mode: Single-player

Diamond Rush is a 2006 action puzzle video game developed and published by Gameloft. It was released for Java Micro Edition mobile platforms in December 2006, and for BlackBerry devices in March 2009. In the game, the player controls an explorer who embarks on a quest to find certain crystals in three different regions: Angkor Wat, Bavaria, and Tibet. The game's title references archaeology, and the player must collect a significant amount of diamonds to unlock the worlds.

== Gameplay ==
The player controls an intrepid explorer searching for diamonds in three worlds: the jungles of Angkor Wat, the dungeons of Bavaria, and the frozen caves of Tibet. There are a total of forty stages spread across the worlds. During the game, the player can find chests that may contain diamonds, which are purple or red. The main objective is to obtain a certain number of red diamonds to access the door that will take you to the other world, but there will be dangers that the player must flee from, including enemies such as snakes and spiders, and traps of fire and giant spears. A boss is found in the last stage of each world.

The player can also obtain extra lives in secret chests, or by completing a certain stage by obtaining all red and purple diamonds, not restarting the stage, and not receiving one or more hits. Each purple diamond obtained can be used in a store to purchase upgrades that increase the player's health bar. As the game progresses, special items such as a hammer, a compass, and a grappling hook can be acquired. The game has a checkpoint system, which is activated when the player steps on a designated circle; a button is dedicated to returning the player to the circle at any time or place, but this will cost them a life.

== Development and release ==
Diamond Rush was developed and published by the French video game company Gameloft. Its gameplay was inspired by Boulder Rush, a 1984 video game by First Star Software for Atari 8-bit computers. Months before its release, Levi Buchanan of IGN experimented with an unfinished version of the game, noting clear similarities to Boulder Dash and some to Ubisoft's Prince of Persia: The Sands of Time (2003); Buchanan also opined that the protagonist bears similarities to the character Link from The Legend of Zelda game series. Diamond Rush was officially announced in July 2006, with IGN reporting that it was "in the latter half of development" and scheduled for release at the end of that year, along with five other unspecified titles from Gameloft.

Diamond Rush was released on 1 December 2006, for mobile devices compatible with the Java Micro Edition (Java ME) platform. A version for BlackBerry devices was released on 12 March 2009. By 2010, many other cell phones also supported the game, including different models of Alcatel, LG, Motorola, Nokia, Panasonic, Sagem, Samsung, and Sony Ericsson devices. The game was re-released in October 2017 in a compilation titled Gameloft Classics Arcade for Android devices via Gameloft's official website, along with four other titles from the company: Miami Nights 2, Brain Challenge 3, Block Breaker Deluxe 2, and Bubble Bash 2. In April 2020, Diamond Rush, along with all other titles featured in Gameloft Classics Arcade, was re-released for free on Android in a collection of 30 games celebrating Gameloft's 20th anniversary, titled Gameloft Classics: 20 Years.

== Reception ==
Reception

Review scores
| Publication | Score |
|---|---|
| IGN | 7.2/10 |
| Airgamer | 9/10 |
| Pocket Gamer | 3.5/5 |

Overall, Diamond Rush received positive reviews from critics. Levi Buchanan of IGN said that the game "may be a familiar play to puzzle fans — Boulder Dash has been around for some time — but the presentation and extras found in Gameloft's rendition push it above the game that obviously inspired it." The graphics were also highly praised, as Buchanan noted that Gameloft used "its artistic wizardry to give the [game] its best look yet". Eva Wagner from the German website Airgamer said that the worlds "surpass themselves in their diversity" and that the graphics "impress with their high level of detail." Veselin Zhilov of Top Games gave Diamond Rush a "Pleasure" rating of nine out of ten stars.

On the other hand, the game's difficulty received a mixed response. Writing for Pocket Gamer, Michael French said that while Diamond Rush has a mild challenge, "unfortunately it irritates after a while", mainly due to its "trial and error nature." Buchanan of IGN said that while it's fun, the game is "frustrating", noting a good amount of challenge, but pointing out that "setting up a wicked puzzle with only one solution is almost mean. Especially when you're just trying to enjoy a three-minute break from real life." Hugo Reyes of Wireless Gaming World commented that the game "is too easy for those of you who are looking for a serious challenge", noting that the title "is meant for a young audience", lamenting that it is not intriguing enough for him, saying he was "hoping for something a little more intriguing."
