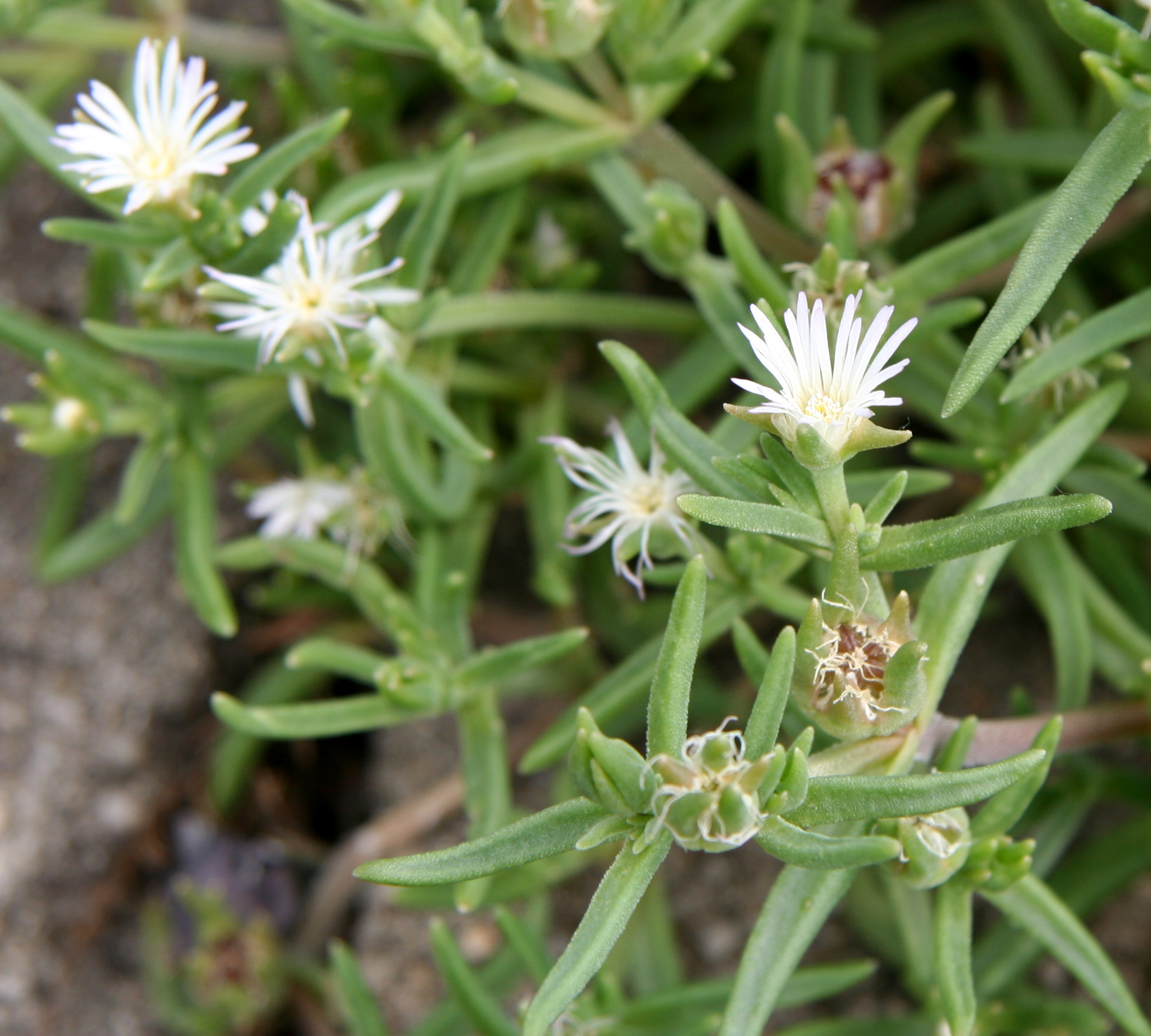

Conservation status
- Least Concern (SANBI Red List)

Scientific classification
- Kingdom: Plantae
- Clade: Tracheophytes
- Clade: Angiosperms
- Clade: Eudicots
- Order: Caryophyllales
- Family: Aizoaceae
- Genus: Delosperma
- Species: D. mahonii

Binomial name
- Delosperma mahonii (N.E.Br.) N.E.Br.

Synonyms
- Mesembryanthemum mahonii N.E.Br.

= Delosperma mahonii =

Species of flowering plant

Delosperma mahonii is a perennial succulent belonging to the Aizoaceae family. The species is native to Botswana, Mozambique, South Africa, and Zimbabwe. It is relatively little-known and has lost a significant amount of habitat in Gauteng.
