= Delosperma zeederbergii =

Scientific classification
- Kingdom: Plantae
- Clade: Tracheophytes
- Clade: Angiosperms
- Clade: Eudicots
- Order: Caryophyllales
- Family: Aizoaceae
- Genus: Delosperma
- Species: D. zeederbergii

Binomial name
- Delosperma zeederbergii L.Bolus

Species of flowering plant

Delosperma zeederbergii, commonly known as the Spekboom River mesemb or spekboomriviervygie, is a perennial succulent belonging to the Aizoaceae family. The species is endemic to Mpumalanga and occurs near Lydenburg.
