= Delosperma frutescens =

Conservation status
- Least Concern (IUCN 3.1)

Scientific classification
- Kingdom: Plantae
- Clade: Tracheophytes
- Clade: Angiosperms
- Clade: Eudicots
- Order: Caryophyllales
- Family: Aizoaceae
- Genus: Delosperma
- Species: D. frutescens

Binomial name
- Delosperma frutescens L.Bolus

Species of flowering plant

Delosperma frutescens, commonly known as the dwarf tree mesemb, shrubby delosperma or dwerg-boomvygie, is a perennial succulent belonging to the Aizoaceae family. The species is endemic to the Eastern Cape.
