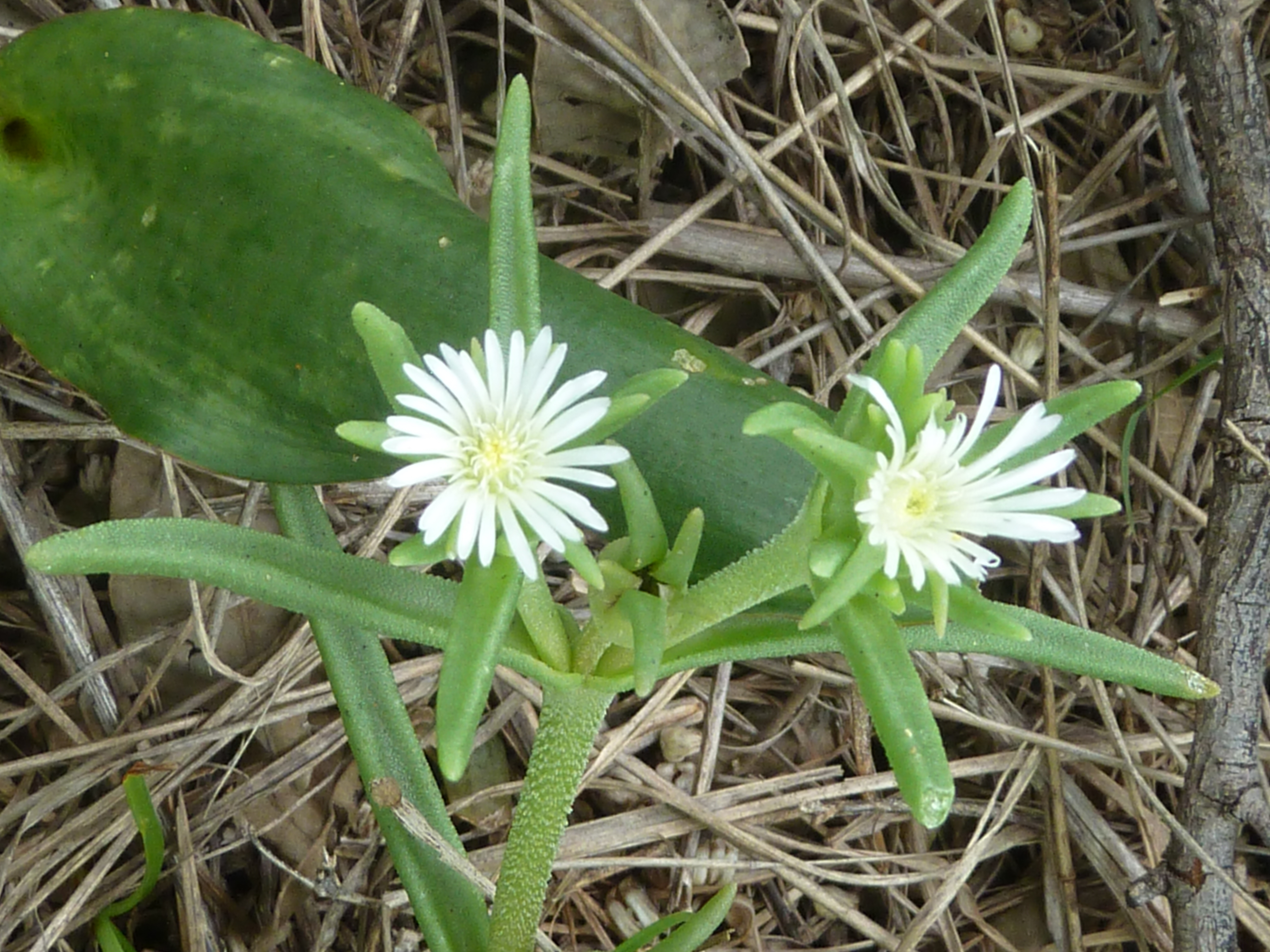

Scientific classification
- Kingdom: Plantae
- Clade: Tracheophytes
- Clade: Angiosperms
- Clade: Eudicots
- Order: Caryophyllales
- Family: Aizoaceae
- Genus: Delosperma
- Species: D. herbeum

Binomial name
- Delosperma herbeum (N.E.Br.) N.E.Br.

Synonyms
- Delosperma framesii L.Bolus; Mesembryanthemum herbeum N.E.Br.

= Delosperma herbeum =

Species of plant

Delosperma herbeum, commonly known as the Highveld white vygie or witbergvygie, is a perennial succulent belonging to the Aizoaceae family. The species is native to Botswana, Eswatini, and South Africa. In South Africa, the plant occurs in Gauteng, Mpumalanga, North West, and the Free State.
