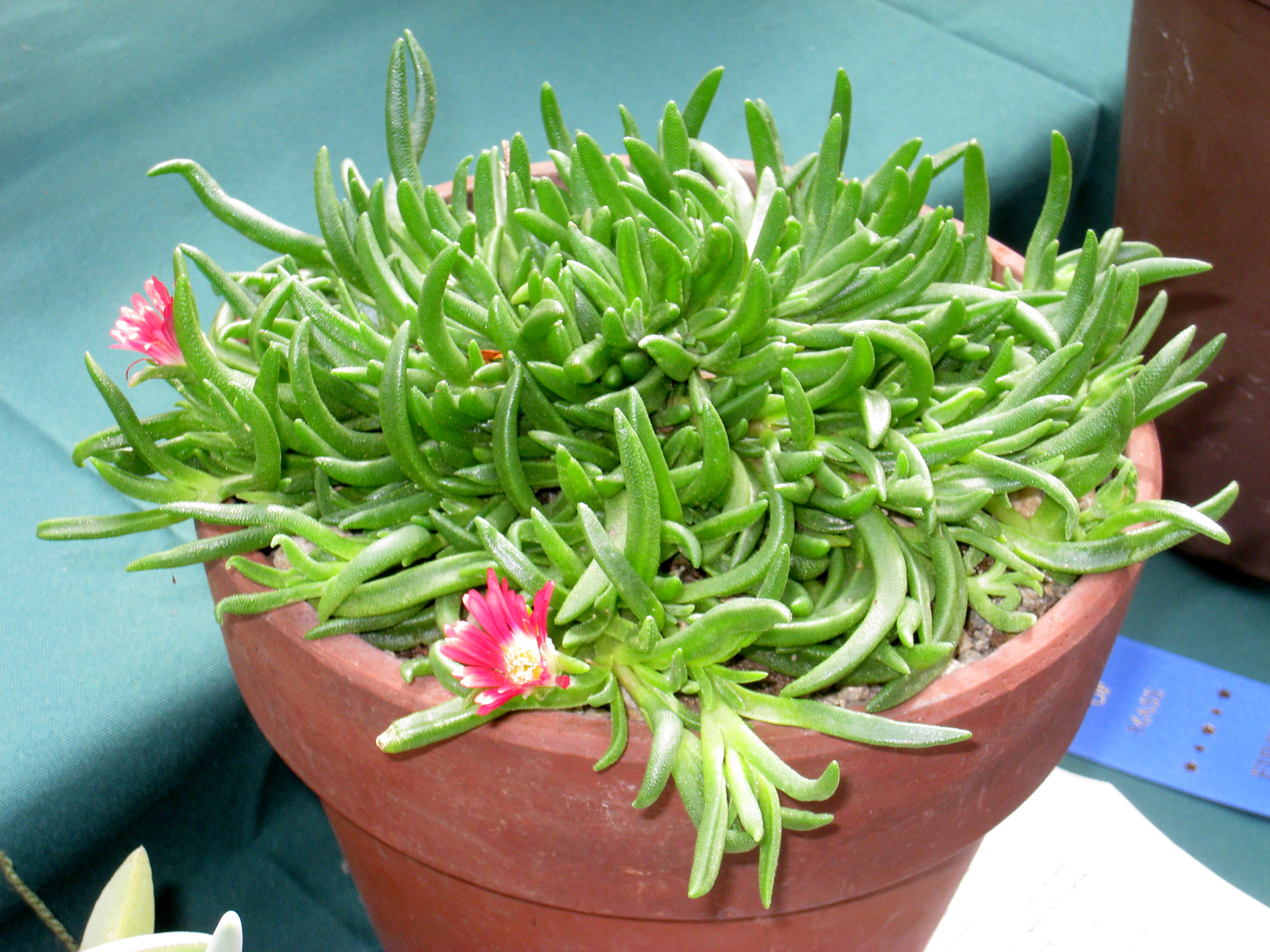

Scientific classification
- Kingdom: Plantae
- Clade: Tracheophytes
- Clade: Angiosperms
- Clade: Eudicots
- Order: Caryophyllales
- Family: Aizoaceae
- Genus: Delosperma
- Species: D. dyeri

Binomial name
- Delosperma dyeri L.Bolus

Synonyms
- Delosperma dyeri var. laxum L.Bolus

= Delosperma dyeri =

Species of flowering plant

Delosperma dyeri, commonly known as the Red Mountain ice plant or Dyer's ice plant, is a perennial succulent belonging to the Aizoaceae family. The species is endemic to the Eastern Cape.
