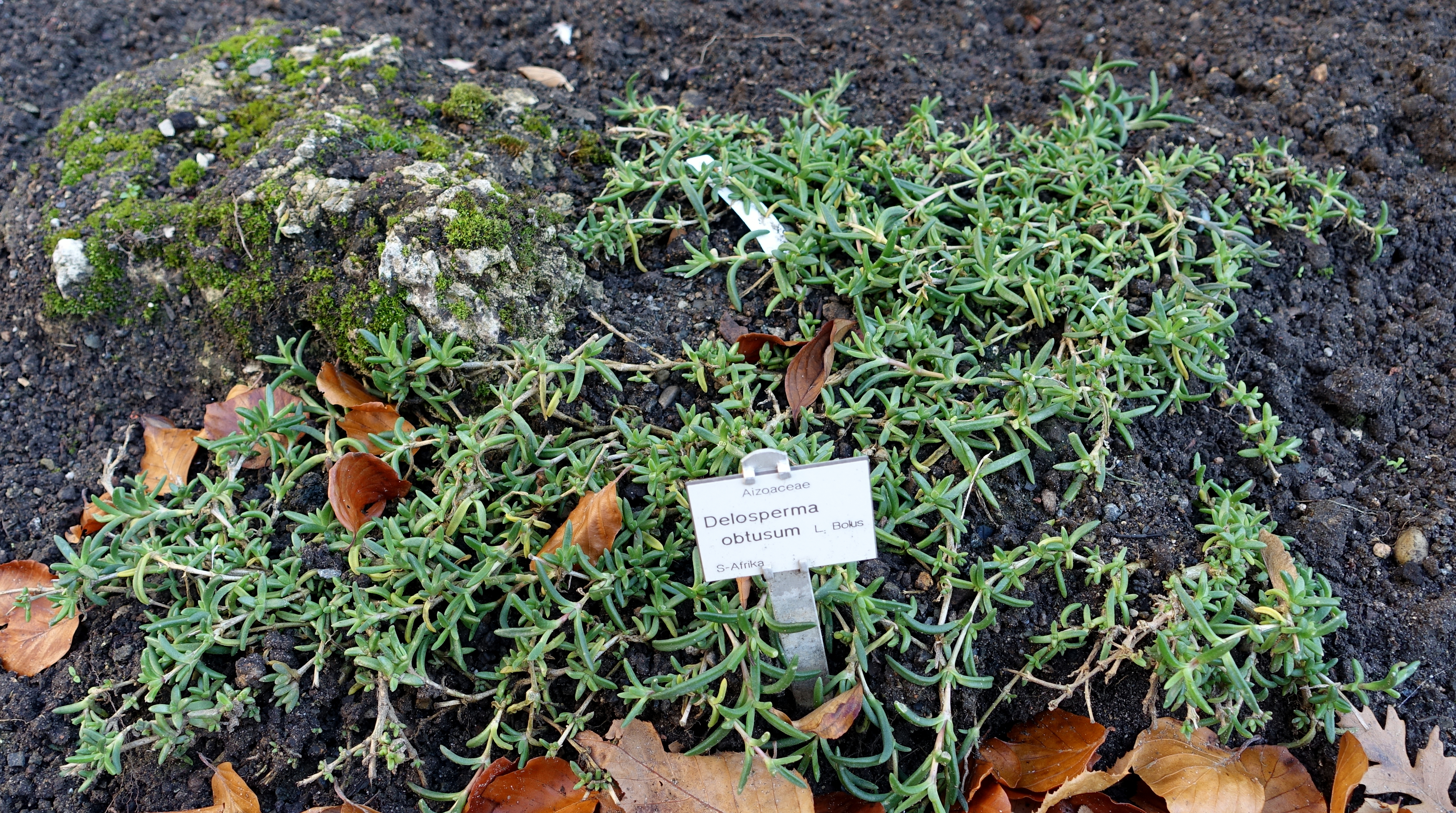

Conservation status
- Least Concern (SANBI Red List)

Scientific classification
- Kingdom: Plantae
- Clade: Tracheophytes
- Clade: Angiosperms
- Clade: Eudicots
- Order: Caryophyllales
- Family: Aizoaceae
- Genus: Delosperma
- Species: D. obtusum

Binomial name
- Delosperma obtusum L.Bolus

= Delosperma obtusum =

Species of flowering plant

Delosperma obtusum, commonly known as the mountain vygie, kransvygie, or dwarf purple ice plant, is a flowering plant that forms part of the genus Delosperma. It is native to the Free State. The plant grows only 5 cm tall and the flowers are bright magenta in colour.
