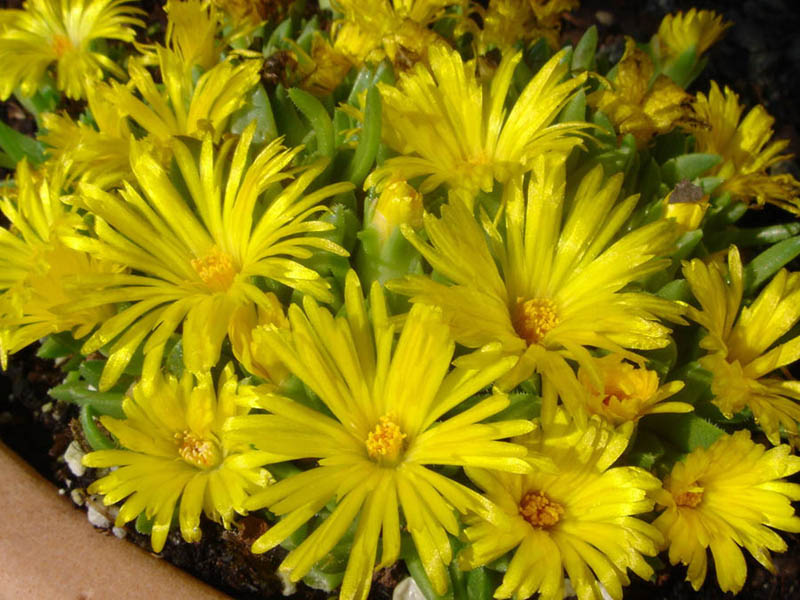

Scientific classification
- Kingdom: Plantae
- Clade: Tracheophytes
- Clade: Angiosperms
- Clade: Eudicots
- Order: Caryophyllales
- Family: Aizoaceae
- Genus: Delosperma
- Species: D. basuticum

Binomial name
- Delosperma basuticum L.Bolus

= Delosperma basuticum =

Species of flowering plant

Delosperma basuticum, commonly known as the white-eyed ice plant or Lesotho sheepfig, is a perennial succulent belonging to the Aizoaceae family. The species is endemic to Lesotho.
