= Delosperma lebomboense =

Scientific classification
- Kingdom: Plantae
- Clade: Tracheophytes
- Clade: Angiosperms
- Clade: Eudicots
- Order: Caryophyllales
- Family: Aizoaceae
- Genus: Delosperma
- Species: D. lebomboense

Binomial name
- Delosperma lebomboense (L.Bolus) Lavis

Synonyms
- Delosperma tradescantioides var. lebomboense L.Bolus

Species of flowering plant

Delosperma lebomboense, often spelled lebomboensis and commonly known as the Lebombo mat sheepfig, is a perennial succulent belonging to the Aizoaceae family. The species is native to Eswatini and South Africa and occurs in KwaZulu-Natal and Mpumalanga.
