= Delosperma purpureum =

Scientific classification
- Kingdom: Plantae
- Clade: Tracheophytes
- Clade: Angiosperms
- Clade: Eudicots
- Order: Caryophyllales
- Family: Aizoaceae
- Genus: Delosperma
- Species: D. purpureum

Binomial name
- Delosperma purpureum H.E.K.Hartmann

Species of plant

Delosperma purpureum, commonly known as the purple delosperma, is a perennial succulent belonging to the Aizoaceae family. The species is endemic to Gauteng.
