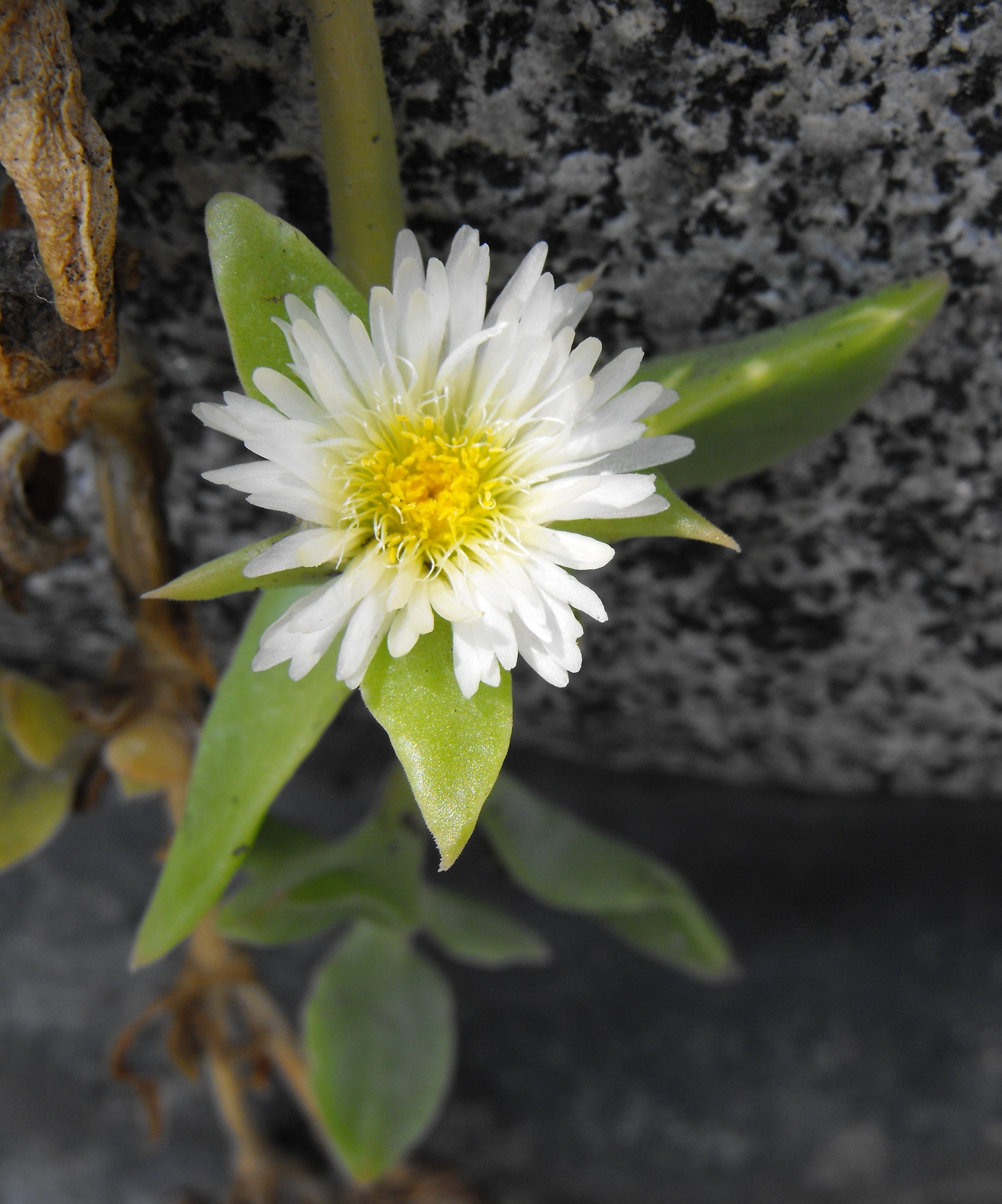

Scientific classification
- Kingdom: Plantae
- Clade: Tracheophytes
- Clade: Angiosperms
- Clade: Eudicots
- Order: Caryophyllales
- Family: Aizoaceae
- Genus: Delosperma
- Species: D. tradescantioides

Binomial name
- Delosperma tradescantioides (A.Berger) L.Bolus

= Delosperma tradescantioides =

Species of flowering plant

Delosperma tradescantioides, commonly known as the trailing vygie or Kei delosperma, is a perennial succulent belonging to the Aizoaceae family. The species is native to Eswatini, Mozambique, and South Africa. In South Africa, the plant occurs in KwaZulu-Natal, Mpumalanga, and the Eastern Cape.
