= Delosperma hirtum =

Scientific classification
- Kingdom: Plantae
- Clade: Tracheophytes
- Clade: Angiosperms
- Clade: Eudicots
- Order: Caryophyllales
- Family: Aizoaceae
- Genus: Delosperma
- Species: D. hirtum

Binomial name
- Delosperma hirtum (N.E.Br.) Schwantes

Species of flowering plant

Delosperma hirtum, commonly known as the berg sheepfig or mabone, is a perennial succulent belonging to the Aizoaceae family. The species is native to Lesotho and South Africa. In South Africa, the plant occurs in KwaZulu-Natal, Mpumalanga, and the Free State.
