= Delosperma karrooicum =

Scientific classification
- Kingdom: Plantae
- Clade: Tracheophytes
- Clade: Angiosperms
- Clade: Eudicots
- Order: Caryophyllales
- Family: Aizoaceae
- Genus: Delosperma
- Species: D. karrooicum

Binomial name
- Delosperma karrooicum L.Bolus

Species of flowering plant

Delosperma karrooicum, commonly known as the Karoo ice plant or Karoo vygie, is a perennial succulent belonging to the Aizoaceae family. The species is endemic to the Eastern Cape. The plant has an extent of occurrence of 21,754 km² and occurs along the Great Escarpment in the Eastern Cape. Fifteen subpopulations are currently known, and the plant faces no threats.
