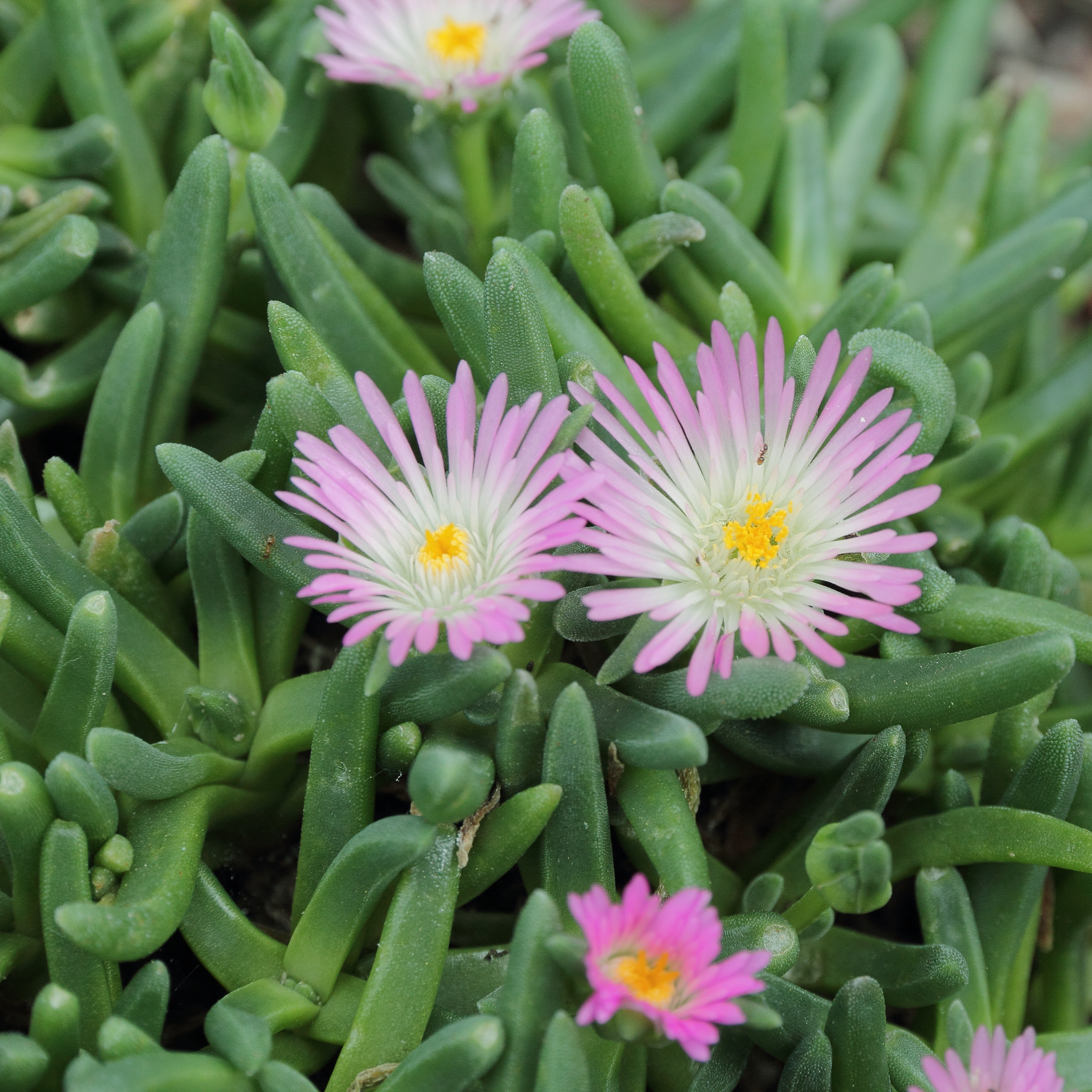

Scientific classification
- Kingdom: Plantae
- Clade: Tracheophytes
- Clade: Angiosperms
- Clade: Eudicots
- Order: Caryophyllales
- Family: Aizoaceae
- Genus: Delosperma
- Species: D. harazianum

Binomial name
- Delosperma harazianum (Deflers) Poppend. & Ihlenf.

Synonyms
- Mesembryanthemum harazianum Deflers

= Delosperma harazianum =

Species of flowering plant

Delosperma harazianum is a perennial succulent belonging to the Aizoaceae family. The species is native to Yemen and Saudi Arabia.
