= Thembelihle Local Municipality =

Thembelihle
- Local municipality
- Seal

- Location in the Northern Cape
- Coordinates: 29°45′S 23°45′E
- Country: South Africa
- Province: Northern Cape
- District: Pixley ka Seme
- Seat: Hopetown
- Wards: 6

Government
  - Type: Municipal council
  - Mayor: Marnus Visser (Siyathemba Community Movement)

Area
  - Total: 8,023 km^{2} (3,098 sq mi)

Population (2022)
  - Total: 22,542
  - Density: 2.810/km^{2} (7.277/sq mi)

Racial makeup (2022)
  - Black African: 12.2%
  - Coloured: 67.3%
  - Indian/Asian: 0.5%
  - White: 19.7%

First languages (2011)
  - Afrikaans: 90.4%
  - Xhosa: 5.1%
  - English: 1.3%
  - Tswana: 1.3%
  - Other: 1.9%
- Time zone: UTC+2 (SAST)
- Municipal code: NC076

Thembelihle Municipality (Afrikaans: Thembelihle Munisipaliteit), formerly known as Oranje-Karoo Municipality, is a local municipality within the Pixley ka Seme District Municipality, in the Northern Cape province of South Africa. Thembelihle is a Xhosa word meaning "good hope".

== History ==
At the end of the apartheid era, in the area that is today the Thembelihle Municipality, there were municipal councils for Hopetown and Strydenburg which were elected by the white residents, while the coloured residents of Steynville (Hopetown) and Strydenburg were governed by management committees subordinate to the white councils. The remaining rural areas were served by the Bo-Karoo Regional Services Council.

After the national elections of 1994 a process of local government transformation began, in which negotiations were held between the existing local authorities, political parties, and local community organisations. As a result of these negotiations, the existing local authorities were dissolved and transitional local councils (TLCs) were created for each town. The Strydenburg municipality and management committee were replaced by a TLC in September 1994, and the Hopetown municipality and Steynville management committee were replaced by a TLC in March 1995. The transitional councils were initially made up of members nominated by the various parties to the negotiations, until May 1996 when elections were held. At these elections the Bo-Karoo District Council was established, replacing the Bo-Karoo Regional Services Council. Transitional representative councils (TRCs) were also elected to represent the areas not included in the TLCs on the District Council; the area that was to become Thembelihle Municipality was part of the Oranje-Karoo TRC, except for Orania which had a separate TRC.

At the local elections of December 2000 the TLCs and TRCs were dissolved and the Oranje-Karoo Municipality (renamed Thembelihle in June 2001) was established as a single local authority. The Orania TRC challenged its dissolution in the Kimberley High Court, and under a settlement with the provincial government this TRC retained its powers and functions indefinitely pending further negotiations. Orania residents are entitled to vote in elections for the Thembelihle council, and 21% of registered voters in Orania cast a ballot in the 2021 elections, but as of 2016 they did not receive any municipal services from Thembelihle.

== Geography ==
The municipality covers an area of 8,023 square kilometres (3,098 sq mi) on the left (south) bank of the Orange River, approximately 130 kilometres (80 mi) south of the provincial capital Kimberley. The principal town is Hopetown (pop. 10,259), which is situated on the Orange River. Other settlements are Strydenburg (pop. 2,987) situated 50 kilometres (30 mi) to the south-west of Hopetown, and Orania (pop. 2,874 at 2023) situated on the Orange River 35 kilometres (22 mi) to the south-east of Hopetown. The remainder of the municipality is rural, mostly used for farming of sheep and goats while intensive irrigated agriculture occurs along the Orange River. The main transport links in the municipal area are the N12 national road and the De Aar–Kimberley railway line, both of which pass north-south through the municipality.

== Demographics ==
At the time of the 2022 census, the population of the municipality had increased to 22,542 people. Of these, 67.3% identified as "Coloured," 19.7% as "White," and 12.2% as "Black African." The White population of the municipality more than doubled between 2011 and 2022, from 2,055 persons to 4,433, driven primarily by the growth of the Afrikaner town of Orania.

In the census of 2011, the municipality had a reported population of 15,701 inhabitants in 4,140 households, giving a population density of 1.96 inhabitants per square kilometre (5.1/sq mi). 70.75% of residents identified as "Coloured," 15.23% as "Black African," and 13.09% as "White."

According to the census, the main spoken language in the municipality is Afrikaans, which is home language of 89% of residents. It is followed by isiXhosa (5%), English and Setswana (1% each). 31% of residents were under the age of 15.

== Politics ==
The municipal council consists of eleven members elected by mixed-member proportional representation. Six councillors are elected by first-past-the-post voting in six wards, while the remaining three are chosen from party lists so that the total number of party representatives is proportional to the number of votes received.

For most of the time since its creation in 2000 Thembelihle has been governed by the African National Congress (ANC), which won outright majorities in the 2000, 2006 and 2011 municipal elections. The opposition took control of the council in December 2011, however, after ANC lost a by-election to an independent candidate. The independent, former ANC member Danny Jonas, became the new mayor of the municipality supported by the Congress of the People and the Democratic Alliance. Jonas later joined the Economic Freedom Fighters (EFF).

In the election of 3 August 2016 the ANC won a majority of four seats on the council. After the 2021 municipal elections, Leonard Makena of the EFF became mayor, and was deposed in 2024 after a new alliance between the ANC and the Siyathemba Community Movement was formed.

The following table shows the results of the 2021 election.

Thembelihle local election, 1 November 2021
Party	Votes				Seats		
Party	Ward	List	Total	%	Ward	List	Total
African National Congress	2,186	2,157	4,343	39.8%	4	1	5
Economic Freedom Fighters	1,315	1,362	2,677	24.5%	1	2	3
Democratic Alliance	627	705	1,332	12.2%	0	1	1
Freedom Front Plus	551	470	1,021	9.4%	1	0	1
Siyathemba Community Movement	152	557	709	6.5%	0	1	1
Independent candidates	462	–	462	4.2%	0	–	0
Patriotic Alliance	103	117	220	2.0%	0	0	0
African Christian Democratic Party	69	75	144	1.3%	0	0	0
Total	5,465	5,443	10,908		6	5	11
Valid votes	5,465	5,443	10,908	98.4%			
Spoilt votes	91	86	177	1.6%			
Total votes cast	5,556	5,529	11,085				
Voter turnout	5,562						
Registered voters	9,386						
Turnout percentage	59.3%						
