= Delosperma saxicola =

Scientific classification
- Kingdom: Plantae
- Clade: Tracheophytes
- Clade: Angiosperms
- Clade: Eudicots
- Order: Caryophyllales
- Family: Aizoaceae
- Genus: Delosperma
- Species: D. saxicola

Binomial name
- Delosperma saxicola Lavis

Species of plant

Delosperma saxicola, commonly known as the Tsitsikamma cliff vygie or Tsitsikamma cliff mesemb, is a perennial succulent belonging to the Aizoaceae family. The species is endemic to the Eastern Cape and occurs near Humansdorp. The plant is considered rare and is part of the fynbos.
