= Delosperma abbottii =

Scientific classification
- Kingdom: Plantae
- Clade: Tracheophytes
- Clade: Angiosperms
- Clade: Eudicots
- Order: Caryophyllales
- Family: Aizoaceae
- Genus: Delosperma
- Species: D. abbottii

Binomial name
- Delosperma abbottii van Jaarsv.

Species of plant

Delosperma abbottii, commonly known as the Pondoland cliff-delosperma, is a perennial succulent belonging to the Aizoaceae family. The species is endemic to KwaZulu-Natal in South Africa. The plant is named after Tony Abbott (1936–2013), the founder of PlantLife magazine.
