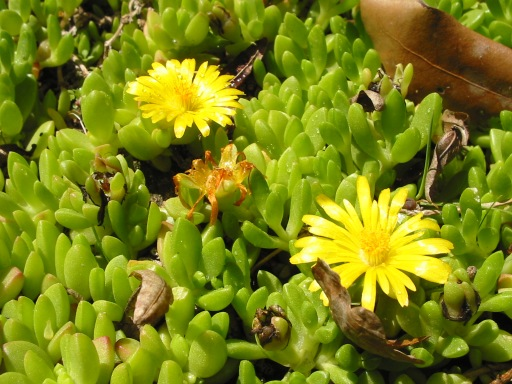

Scientific classification
- Kingdom: Plantae
- Clade: Tracheophytes
- Clade: Angiosperms
- Clade: Eudicots
- Order: Caryophyllales
- Family: Aizoaceae
- Genus: Delosperma
- Species: D. nubigenum

Binomial name
- Delosperma nubigenum (Schltr.) L.Bolus

Synonyms
- Mesembryanthemum nubigenum Schltr.

= Delosperma nubigenum =

Species of flowering plant

Delosperma nubigenum, commonly known as the hardy yellow ice plant or cloud-born delosperma, is a perennial succulent belonging to the Aizoaceae family. The species is native to the Free State and Lesotho.
