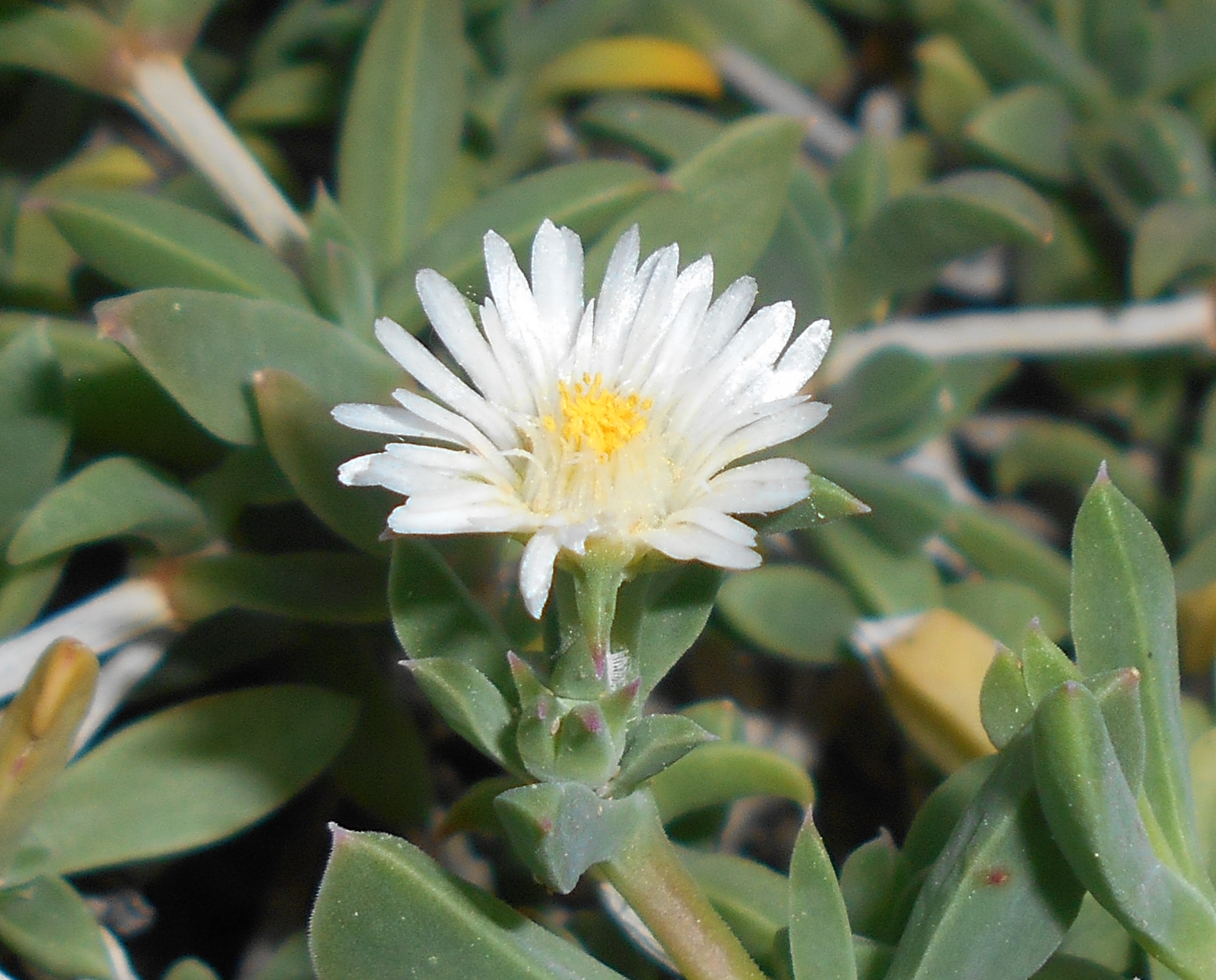

Scientific classification
- Kingdom: Plantae
- Clade: Tracheophytes
- Clade: Angiosperms
- Clade: Eudicots
- Order: Caryophyllales
- Family: Aizoaceae
- Genus: Delosperma
- Species: D. litorale

Binomial name
- Delosperma litorale (Kensit) L.Bolus

Synonyms
- Mesembryanthemum litorale Kensit

= Delosperma litorale =

Species of flowering plant

Delosperma litorale, commonly known as the white trailing ice plant, kalkklipvygie, or skaapvygie, is a perennial succulent belonging to the Aizoaceae family. The species is endemic to the Western Cape.
