= Delosperma davyi =

Scientific classification
- Kingdom: Plantae
- Clade: Tracheophytes
- Clade: Angiosperms
- Clade: Eudicots
- Order: Caryophyllales
- Family: Aizoaceae
- Genus: Delosperma
- Species: D. davyi

Binomial name
- Delosperma davyi N.E.Br.

Species of flowering plant

Delosperma davyi is a perennial succulent belonging to the Aizoaceae family. The species is endemic to Gauteng.
