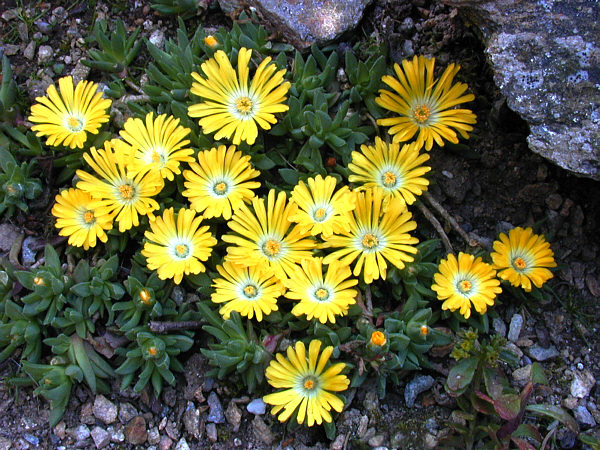

Scientific classification
- Kingdom: Plantae
- Clade: Tracheophytes
- Clade: Angiosperms
- Clade: Eudicots
- Order: Caryophyllales
- Family: Aizoaceae
- Genus: Delosperma
- Species: D. congestum

Binomial name
- Delosperma congestum L.Bolus

= Delosperma congestum =

Species of flowering plant

Delosperma congestum, commonly known as the congested ice plant or hardy ice plant, is a perennial succulent belonging to the Aizoaceae family. The species is native to Lesotho and South Africa, where it occurs in KwaZulu-Natal and the Free State.
