= Basil Schonland =

South African physicist (1896–1972)

Sir Basil Schonland
- Born: 2 February 1896; Grahamstown, Cape Colony
- Died: 24 November 1972 (aged 76); Winchester, Hampshire
- Education: Rhodes University, Gonville and Caius College, Cambridge
- Awards: Order of Mapungubwe (2002); IET Faraday Medal (1962); Wilkins Lecture (1955); Bernard Price Memorial Lecture (1951); Elliott Cresson Medal (1945); Hughes Medal (1945); Chree Medal and Prize (1943); Fellow of the Royal Society (1938); Order of the British Empire (1919)
- Scientific career
- Fields: Physics
- Workplaces: Atomic Energy Research Establishment

Sir Basil Ferdinand Jamieson Schonland OMG CBE FRS (2 February 1896 – 24 November 1972) was a South African physicist and meteorologist noted for his research on lightning, his involvement in the development of radar during World War II and for being the first president of the South African Council for Scientific and Industrial Research.

== Birth and parentage ==
He was born in Grahamstown, Cape Colony to Selmar Schonland (botanist and a founder of Rhodes University) and Flora MacOwan, daughter of Peter MacOwan.

== Education ==
In 1910, Schonland matriculated at the age of 14 from St. Andrew's College as the top pupil in the Cape Province. He later studied at Rhodes University and Gonville and Caius College, Cambridge in the years 1914-15 and 1919-20.

== World War I service ==
During World War I, Schonland volunteered for service and served with the Signal Service of the Royal Engineers in France 1915-18. He was wounded at Arras, mentioned in despatches and was awarded the OBE.

== Early research ==
After the war he became a research student at the Cavendish Laboratory, Cambridge University where he studied the scattering of beta particles. In 1922, Schonland returned to South Africa and took up a post at the University of Cape Town as a lecturer and later professor of physics.

== Marriage and children ==
In 1923, Schonland married Isabel Craib and had one son and two daughters.

== Bernard Price Institute ==
He left Cape Town in 1937 to become the founding director of the Bernard Price Institute of Geophysics at Witwatersrand University where he made significant contributions to the study of atmospheric electricity, photographing lightning and investigating the electric fields generated by thunderclouds. The South African highveld has an exceptionally high lightning incidence which provided abundant material for his work. During this time he spent a scholarship year back at the Cavendish Laboratory, 1927-28.

== World War II activity ==
As a Lt Col, Schonland commanded the South African Special Signals Services at the outbreak of the Second World War and led the development of South Africa's own radar system. In 1941 he went to England to acquire more equipment for South Africa but was requested by Sir John Cockcroft to become superintendent of the Army Operational Research Group of the Air Defence Research and Development Establishment (AORG) at Richmond, Surrey 1941-44. Under his leadership the AORG made significant contributions in a number of fields, especially in the use of radar by the army. By 1944 he was the scientific adviser to Field Marshal Bernard Montgomery with 21st Army Group in England, France and Belgium. By the war's end he held the rank of brigadier.

== Post war scientific service ==
In 1945, Schonland returned to South Africa at the insistence of General Jan Smuts, the prime minister, to establish the Council for Scientific and Industrial Research. He also resumed his post as director of the Bernard Price Institute at Witwatersrand University, and in 1951 became the first chancellor of Rhodes University, retaining this position until 1962. In 1954, Schonland became the deputy director and later director of the Atomic Energy Research Establishment at Harwell, Oxfordshire.

== Knighthood ==
He was knighted by Queen Elizabeth II in 1960 as a Knight Bachelor for his services to British science.

== Retirement and death ==
He retired to the family home near Winchester, in Hampshire, and died after a long illness on 24 November 1972.

== Awards ==
He was awarded the OBE (military), 1919; CBE (military), 1944; and a knighthood, 1960. He was awarded the Chree medal and prize in 1943, the Hughes Medal in 1945, the Elliott Cresson Medal in 1950, presented the inaugural Bernard Price Memorial Lecture in 1951 and was invited to give the Wilkins Lecture in 1955. He was an honorary fellow of Gonville and Caius College, Cambridge, 1959-72. In 1999, he was voted South Africa's "Scientist of the Century" and in 2002 he was awarded posthumously the Order of Mapungubwe - Gold class (OMG) for his services to science in South Africa.

== Schonland Research Centre ==
The Nuclear Physics Research Unit of the University of the Witwatersrand, Johannesburg, founded by Friedel Sellschop, mentee of Prof Schonland, was renamed Schonland Research Centre in 1984.

== Publications ==
- Atmospheric Electricity (1932) OCLC 1900222
- The Flight of Thunderbolts (1950) OCLC 490276
- The Atomists 1805-1933 (1968) OCLC 236856

Schonland's research papers were donated to the Churchill Archives Centre by Lady Schonland in 1973.

== See also ==
- Harwell Synchrocyclotron
