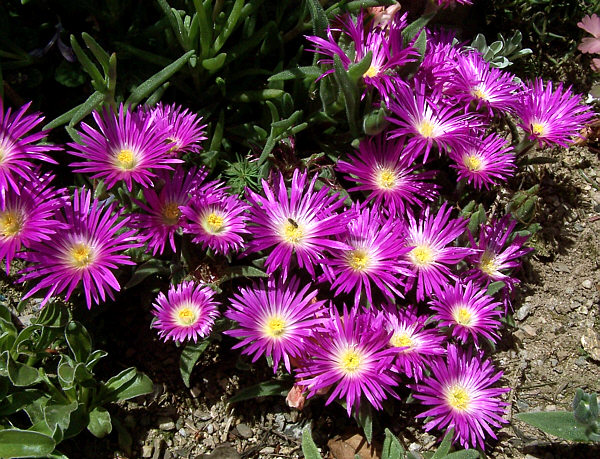

Conservation status
- Least Concern (SANBI Red List)

Scientific classification
- Kingdom: Plantae
- Clade: Tracheophytes
- Clade: Angiosperms
- Clade: Eudicots
- Order: Caryophyllales
- Family: Aizoaceae
- Genus: Delosperma
- Species: D. ashtonii

Binomial name
- Delosperma ashtonii L.Bolus

= Delosperma ashtonii =

Species of flowering plant

Delosperma ashtonii, commonly known as the flatleaf sheepfig, is a perennial succulent belonging to the Aizoaceae family. The species is native to KwaZulu-Natal, Lesotho, and the Free State.
