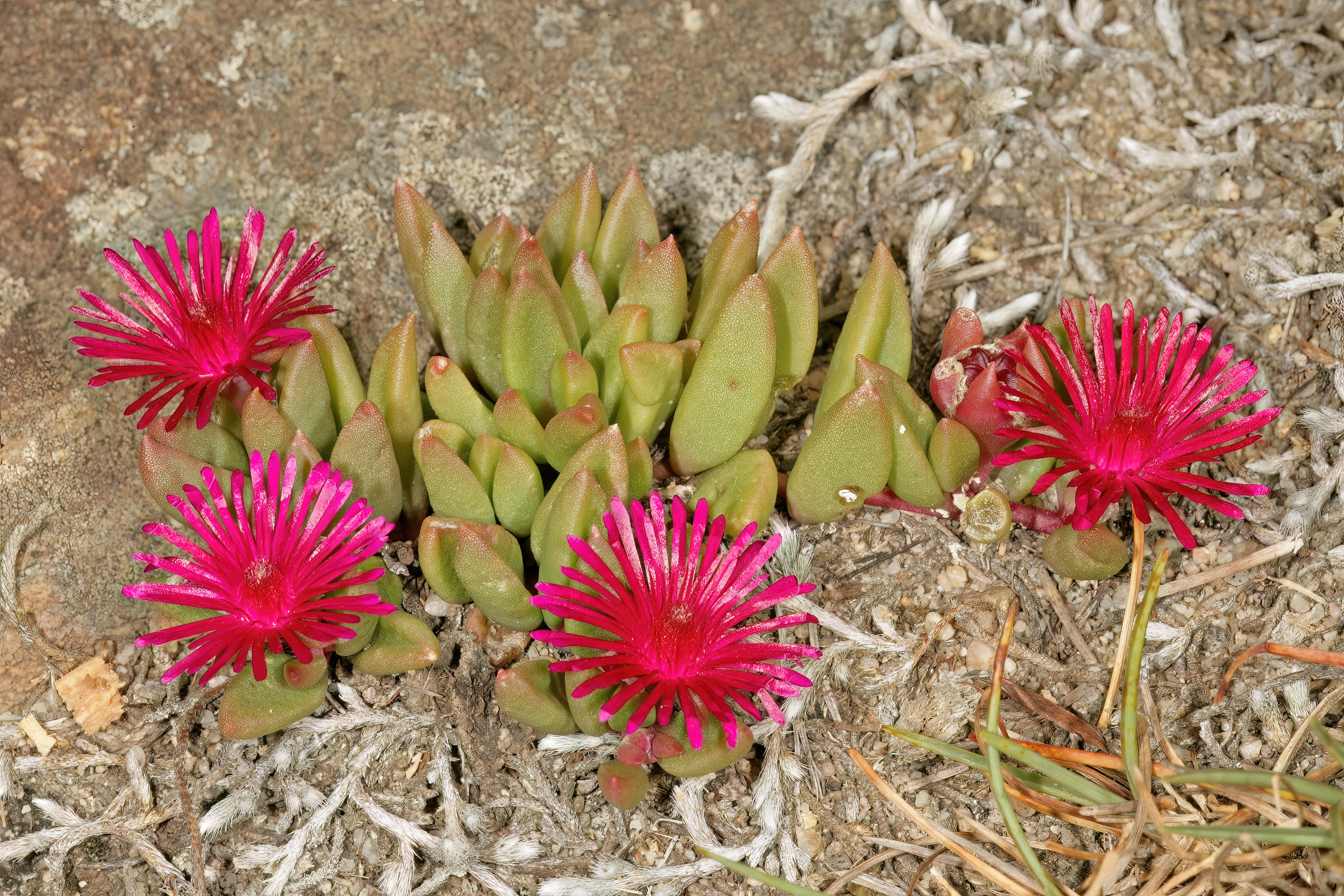

Conservation status
- Least Concern (SANBI Red List)

Scientific classification
- Kingdom: Plantae
- Clade: Tracheophytes
- Clade: Angiosperms
- Clade: Eudicots
- Order: Caryophyllales
- Family: Aizoaceae
- Genus: Delosperma
- Species: D. repens

Binomial name
- Delosperma repens L.Bolus

= Delosperma repens =

Species of flowering plant

Delosperma repens, commonly known as the trailing ice plant or trailing vygie, is a perennial succulent belonging to the Aizoaceae family. The species is endemic to the Eastern Cape and the Free State.
