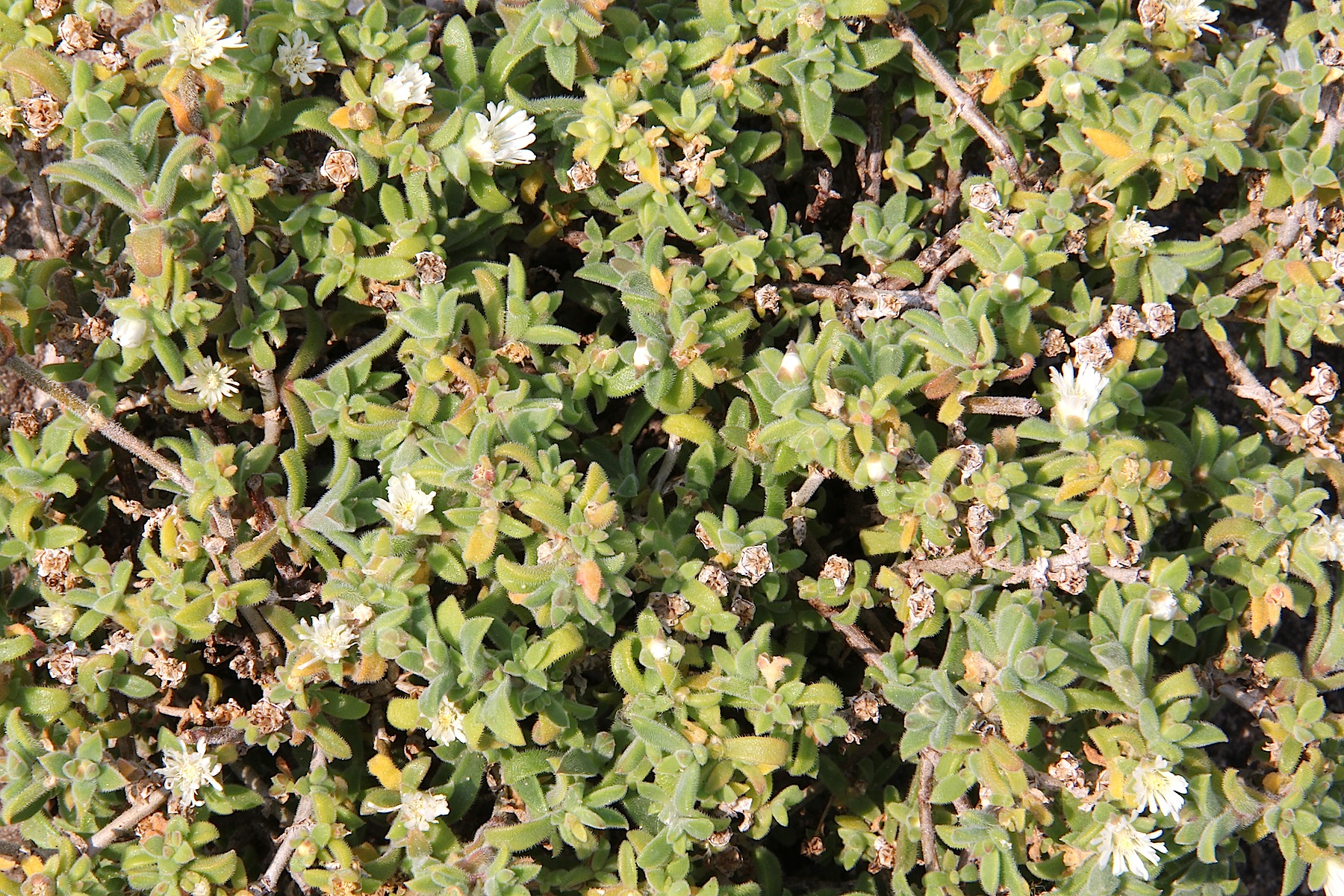

Scientific classification
- Kingdom: Plantae
- Clade: Tracheophytes
- Clade: Angiosperms
- Clade: Eudicots
- Order: Caryophyllales
- Family: Aizoaceae
- Genus: Delosperma
- Species: D. ecklonis

Binomial name
- Delosperma ecklonis (Salm-Dyck) Schwantes

Synonyms
- Delosperma incomptum var. ecklonis (Salm-Dyck) H.Jacobsen; Mesembryanthemum ecklonis Salm-Dyck

= Delosperma ecklonis =

Species of plant

Delosperma ecklonis is a perennial succulent belonging to the Aizoaceae family. The species is endemic to the Eastern Cape.
