= Delosperma waterbergense =

Conservation status
- Least Concern (SANBI Red List)

Scientific classification
- Kingdom: Plantae
- Clade: Tracheophytes
- Clade: Angiosperms
- Clade: Eudicots
- Order: Caryophyllales
- Family: Aizoaceae
- Genus: Delosperma
- Species: D. waterbergense

Binomial name
- Delosperma waterbergense L.Bolus

Species of flowering plant

Delosperma waterbergense, commonly known as the Waterberg delosperma or waterbergvygie, is a perennial succulent belonging to the Aizoaceae family. The species is endemic to the sandstone cliffs of the Waterberg in Limpopo, South Africa.
