= Delosperma ornatulum =

Conservation status
- Least Concern (SANBI Red List)

Scientific classification
- Kingdom: Plantae
- Clade: Tracheophytes
- Clade: Angiosperms
- Clade: Eudicots
- Order: Caryophyllales
- Family: Aizoaceae
- Genus: Delosperma
- Species: D. ornatulum

Binomial name
- Delosperma ornatulum N.E.Br. ex Stapf

Species of flowering plant

Delosperma ornatulum, commonly known as the skaapvygie, is a perennial succulent belonging to the Aizoaceae family. The species is endemic to the Eastern Cape and the Free State.
