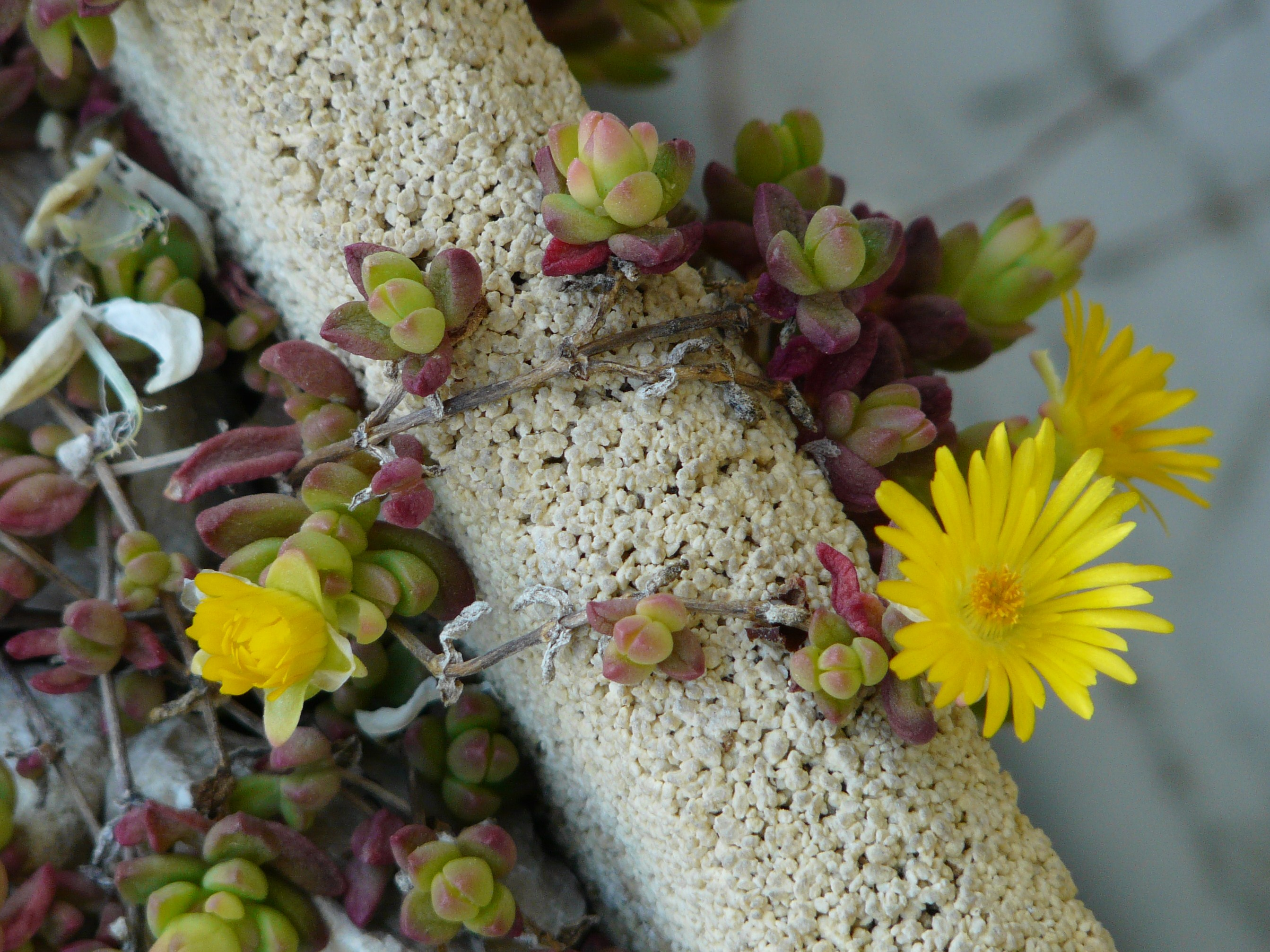

Scientific classification
- Kingdom: Plantae
- Clade: Tracheophytes
- Clade: Angiosperms
- Clade: Eudicots
- Order: Caryophyllales
- Family: Aizoaceae
- Genus: Delosperma
- Species: D. lineare

Binomial name
- Delosperma lineare L.Bolus

Synonyms
- Delosperma lineare var. tenuifolium L.Bolus

= Delosperma lineare =

Species of flowering plant

Delosperma lineare, commonly known as the hardy ice plant or fine sheepfig, is a perennial succulent belonging to the Aizoaceae family. The species is native to KwaZulu-Natal, Lesotho, and the Free State.
