= Delosperma brunnthaleri =

Scientific classification
- Kingdom: Plantae
- Clade: Tracheophytes
- Clade: Angiosperms
- Clade: Eudicots
- Order: Caryophyllales
- Family: Aizoaceae
- Genus: Delosperma
- Species: D. brunnthaleri

Binomial name
- Delosperma brunnthaleri (A.Berger) Schwantes ex H.Jacobsen, (1933)

Synonyms
- Mesembryanthemum brunnthaleri A.Berger; Mesembryanthemum brunnthalerianum A.Berger ex Engl.

Species of flowering plant

Delosperma brunnthaleri, commonly known as Brunthal's ice plant or hardy ice plant, is a perennial succulent belonging to the Aizoaceae family. The species is endemic to the Eastern Cape.
