= Hopetown =

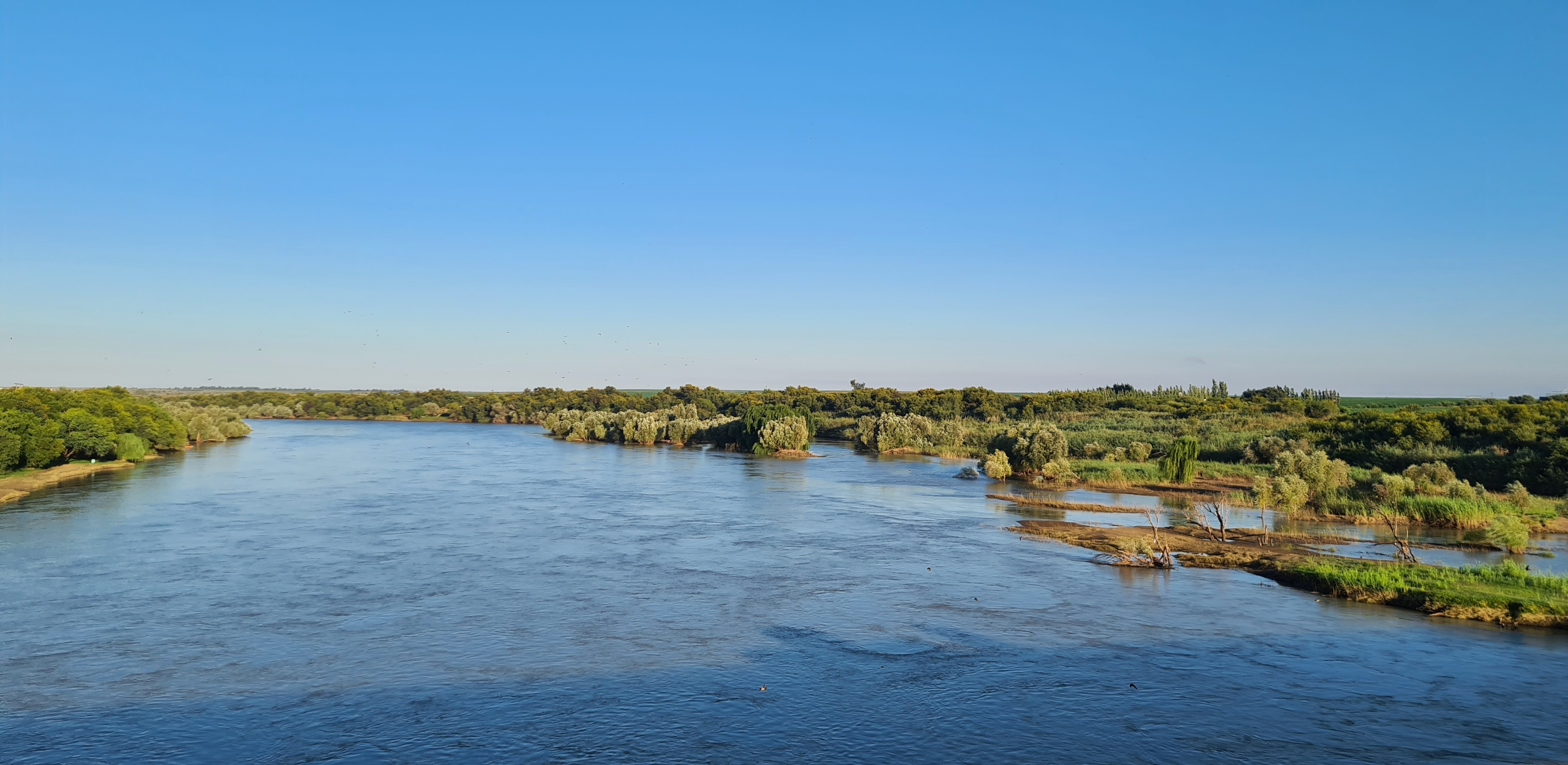
- The Orange River on the outskirts of town

- Location within Northern Cape Location within South Africa
- Coordinates: 29°37′33″S 24°05′08″E
- Country: South Africa
- Province: Northern Cape
- District: Pixley ka Seme
- Municipality: Thembelihle

Area
  - Total: 73.86 km^{2} (28.52 sq mi)

Population (2011)
  - Total: 10,259
  - Density: 138.9/km^{2} (359.7/sq mi)

Racial makeup (2011)
  - Black African: 18.8%
  - Coloured: 73.1%
  - Indian/Asian: 0.7%
  - White: 6.9%
  - Other: 0.5%

First languages (2011)
  - Afrikaans: 88.1%
  - Xhosa: 7.2%
  - Tswana: 1.5%
  - English: 1.3%
  - Other: 2.0%
- Time zone: UTC+2 (SAST)
- Postal code (street): 8750
- PO box: 8750
- Area code: 053

Hopetown is a town which lies at the edge of the Great Karoo in South Africa's Northern Cape province. It is situated on an arid slope leading down to the Orange River. Two of the largest diamonds discovered in South Africa, the Eureka Diamond and the Star of Africa were found at Hopetown between 1867 and 1869

== History ==
Hopetown was founded in 1850 when Sir Harry Smith extended the northern frontier of the Cape Colony to the Orange River. A handful of settlers claimed ground where there was a natural ford over the Orange River, and by 1854 a frontier town had developed. Hopetown was named after William Hope, Auditor-General and Secretary of the Cape Colony Government at the time, and is often mistaken for a town in the Free State, South Africa, called Hoopstad.

Hopetown was a quiet farming area until several large diamonds, most notable the Eureka Diamond and the Star of South Africa, were discovered there between 1867 and 1869. The Cape Government Railways were founded in 1872, and the Cape government decided to run the main western line, between the Kimberley diamond fields and Cape Town on the coast, directly through Hopetown. The ford was upgraded to a railway bridge in 1884.
