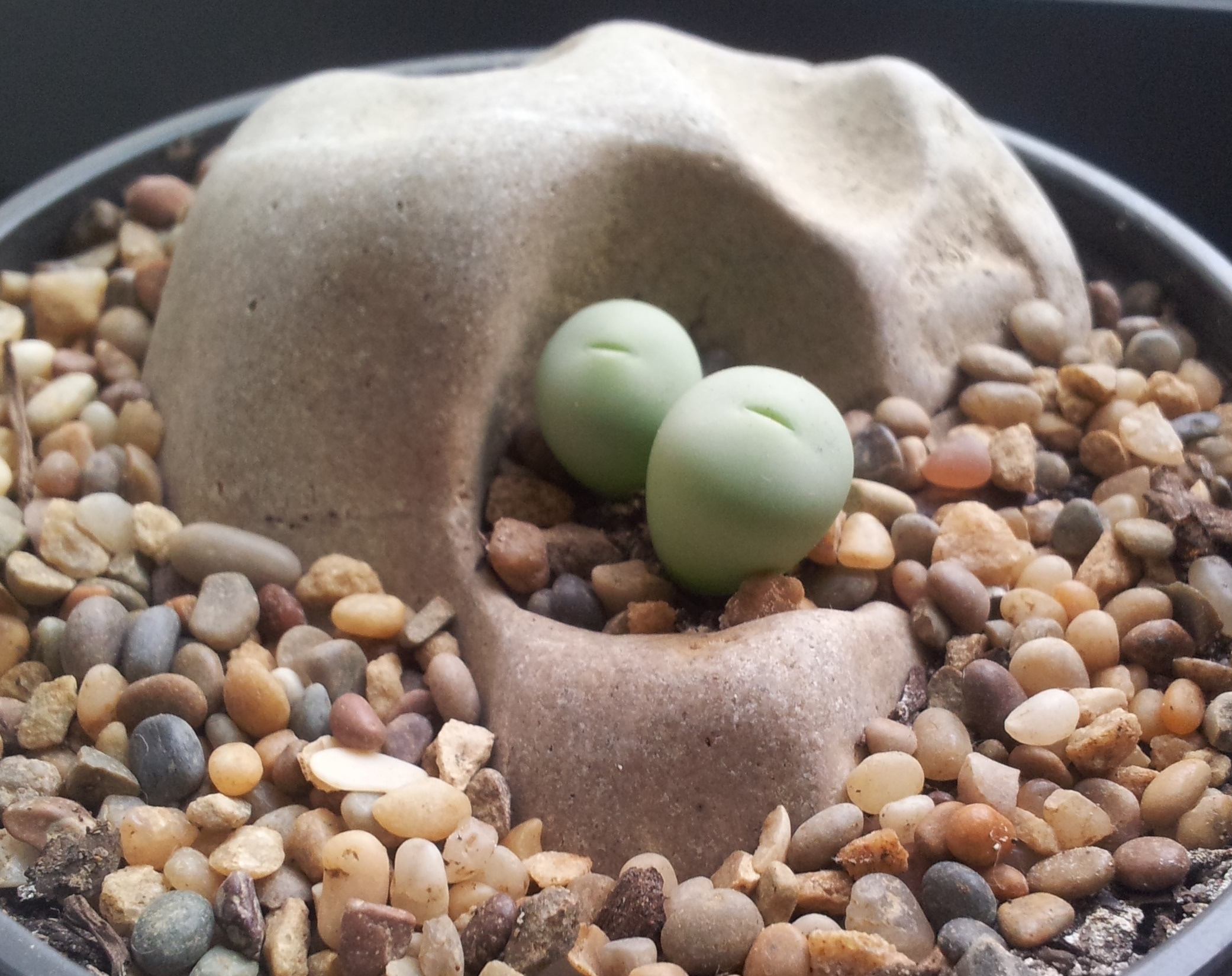

Conservation status
- Vulnerable (IUCN 3.1)
- CITES Appendix III

Scientific classification
- Kingdom: Plantae
- Clade: Embryophytes
- Clade: Tracheophytes
- Clade: Spermatophytes
- Clade: Angiosperms
- Clade: Eudicots
- Order: Caryophyllales
- Family: Aizoaceae
- Genus: Conophytum
- Species: C. breve

Binomial name
- Conophytum breve N.E.Br.

= Conophytum breve =

Species of succulent

Conophytum breve is a small South African species of succulent plant of the genus Conophytum.

== Description ==
Conophytum breve has small, smooth, rounded heads, and offsets to form irregular clumps. The epidermis is a chalky grey to glaucous green, without any spots or markings. It resembles very closely its relative Conophytum calculus, but is much smaller and forms more uneven clusters.

=== Relatives and distinguishing features ===
It is closely related to Conophytum pageae, with which it is often conflated. However C. breve is smaller, with more rounded heads and a more grey-green colour. It is also related to the larger species Conophytum calculus (which is much larger) and to Conophytum stevens-jonesianum (which is covered with spots).

== Distribution ==
This species is indigenous to the Namaqualand, in the far west of the Northern Cape Province, South Africa.

It produces yellow flowers in autumn.
