= Radinosiphon lomatensis =

Scientific classification
- Kingdom: Plantae
- Clade: Tracheophytes
- Clade: Angiosperms
- Clade: Monocots
- Order: Asparagales
- Family: Iridaceae
- Genus: Radinosiphon
- Species: R. lomatensis

Binomial name
- Radinosiphon lomatensis (N.E.Br.) N.E.Br., 1932

Species of flowering plant

Radinosiphon lomatensis is a perennial flowering plant belonging to the family Iridaceae.
