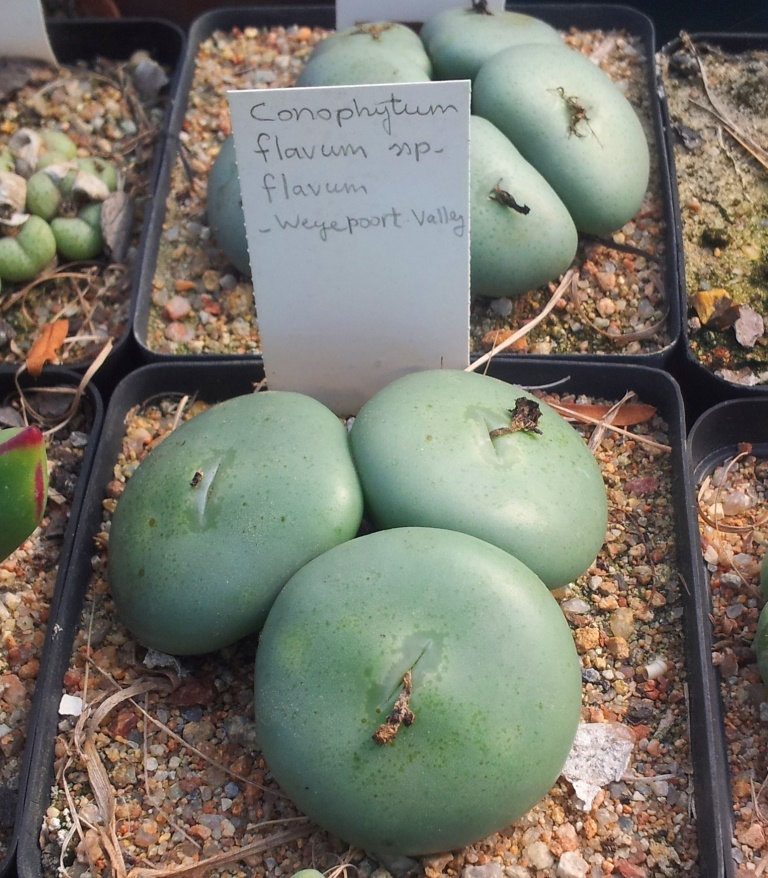
- Conophytum flavum var. flavum

Conservation status
- Endangered (IUCN 3.1)
- CITES Appendix III

Scientific classification
- Kingdom: Plantae
- Clade: Embryophytes
- Clade: Tracheophytes
- Clade: Spermatophytes
- Clade: Angiosperms
- Clade: Eudicots
- Order: Caryophyllales
- Family: Aizoaceae
- Genus: Conophytum
- Species: C. flavum

Binomial name
- Conophytum flavum N.E.Br.

= Conophytum flavum =

Species of succulent

Conophytum flavum, the yellow cone plant, is a small South African species of succulent flowering plant of the family Aizoaceae.

== Description ==
This species has rounded, flattened (truncated) bodies, covered with many idioblasts. Its flowers, which appear in autumn and winter, are unscented and yellow (flavum is Latin for "golden").

== Distribution and habitat ==
It is indigenous to the arid winter-rainfall Namaqualand region, in the far west of South Africa. Here it grows in rocky outcrops and crevices.

In cultivation in the UK this plant has gained the Royal Horticultural Society's Award of Garden Merit. (confirmed 2017).

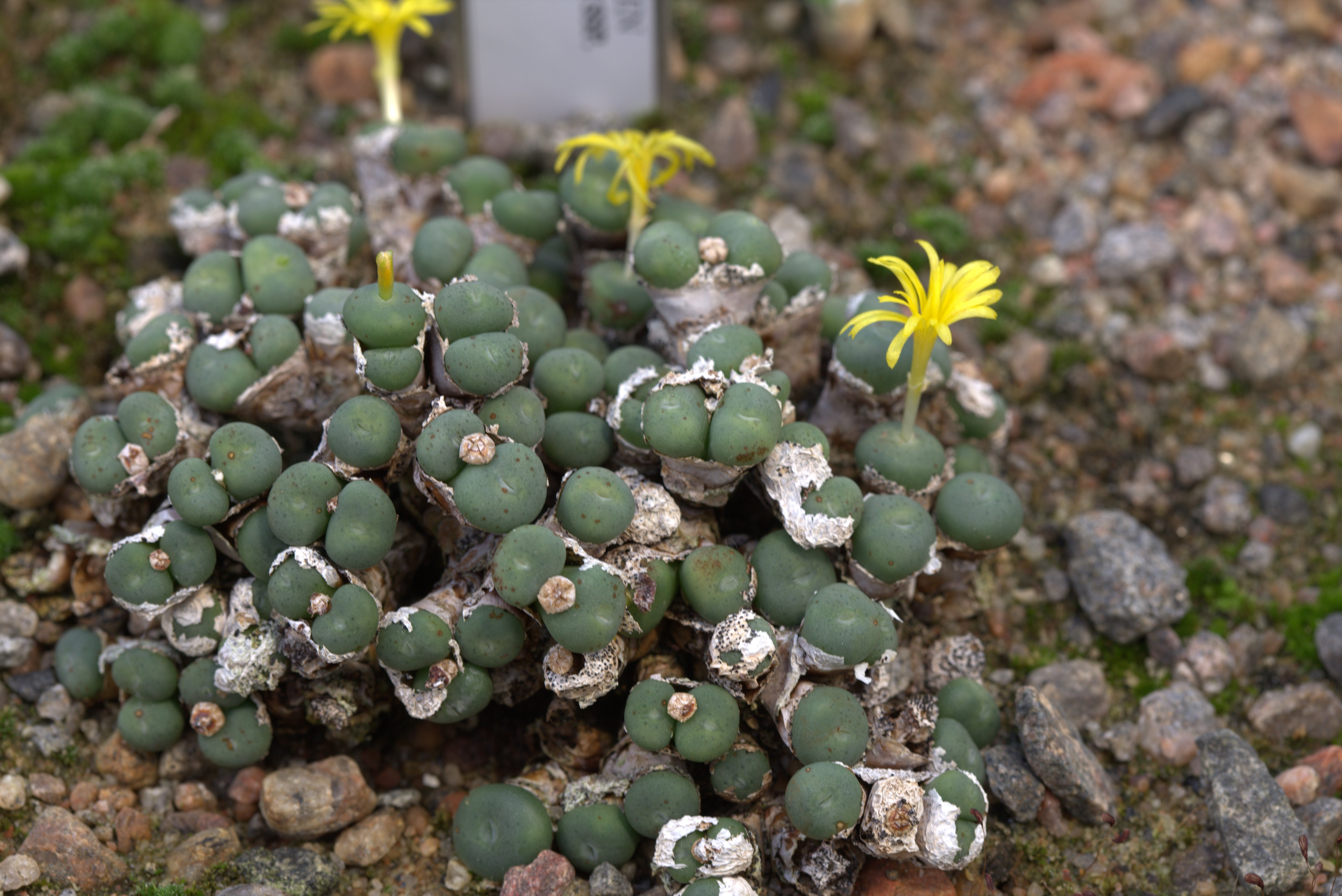
The subspecies novicium

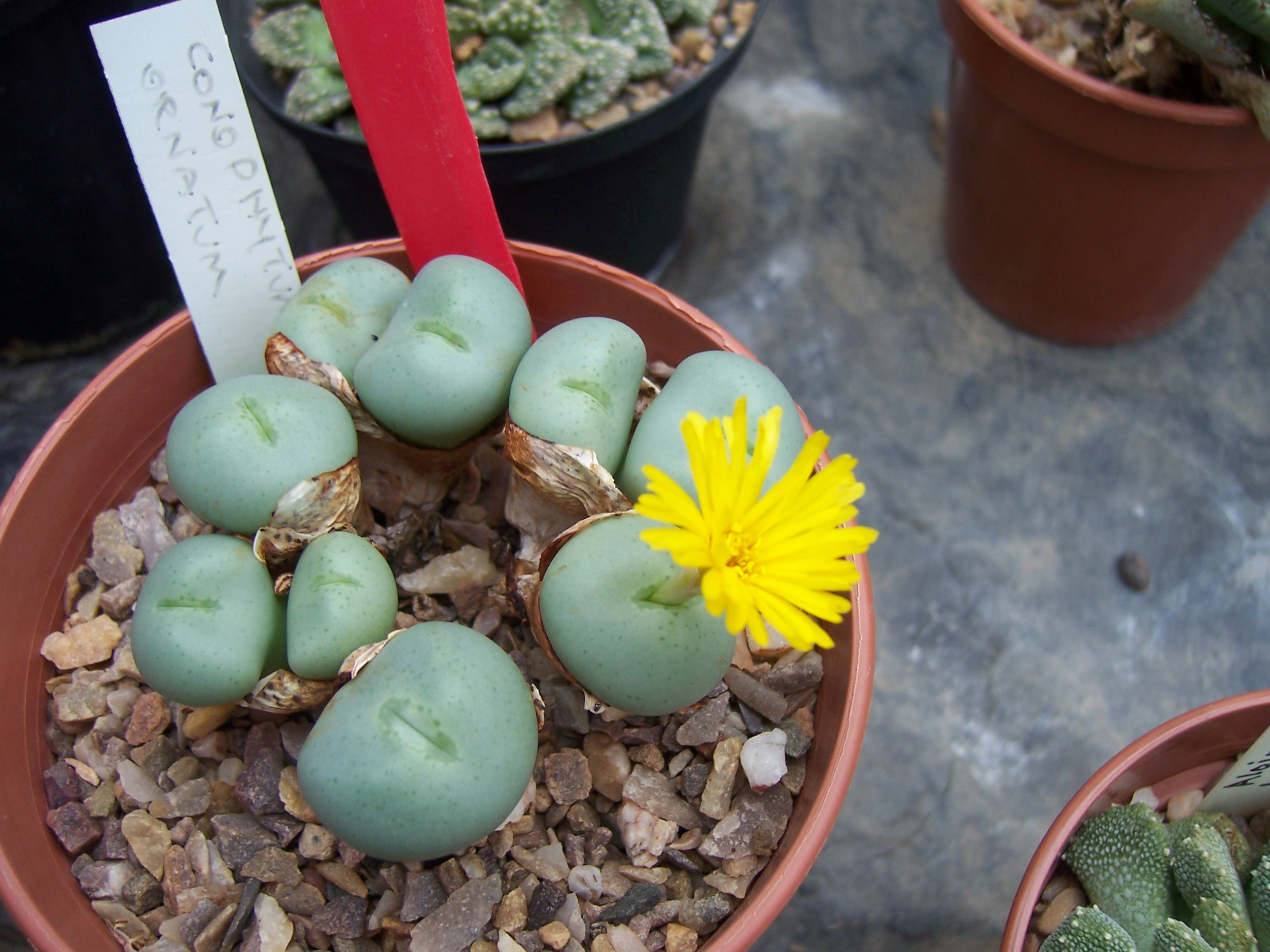
The subspecies flavum
