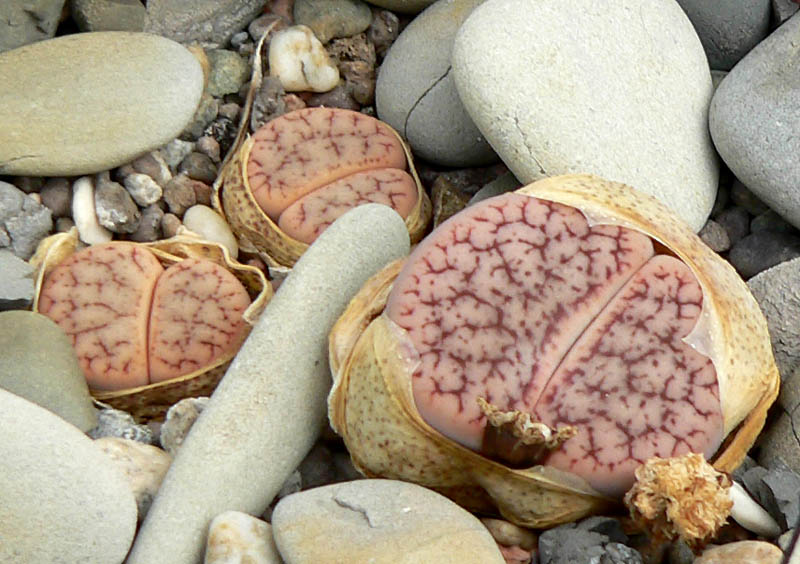

Scientific classification
- Kingdom: Plantae
- Clade: Embryophytes
- Clade: Tracheophytes
- Clade: Angiosperms
- Clade: Eudicots
- Order: Caryophyllales
- Family: Aizoaceae
- Genus: Lithops
- Species: L. pseudotruncatella

Binomial name
- Lithops pseudotruncatella (A.Berger) N.E.Br.

Synonyms
- Lithops alpina Dinter; Lithops elisabethiae Dinter; Lithops mundtii Tischer; Lithops pseudotruncatella var. alpina (Dinter) Boom; Lithops pseudotruncatella var. riehmerae D.T.Cole; Lithops pseudotruncatella subsp. volkii (Schwantes ex de Boer & Boom) D.T.Cole; Mesembryanthemum pseudotruncatellum A.Berger

= Lithops pseudotruncatella =

Species of plant

Lithops pseudotruncatella is a species of succulent in the family Aizoaceae. Initial confusion associated with Conophytum truncatum is where it derives its name, literally meaning "fake-truncatum". It also received The Royal Horticultural Society's Award of Garden Merit. The plant is endemic to Namibia.

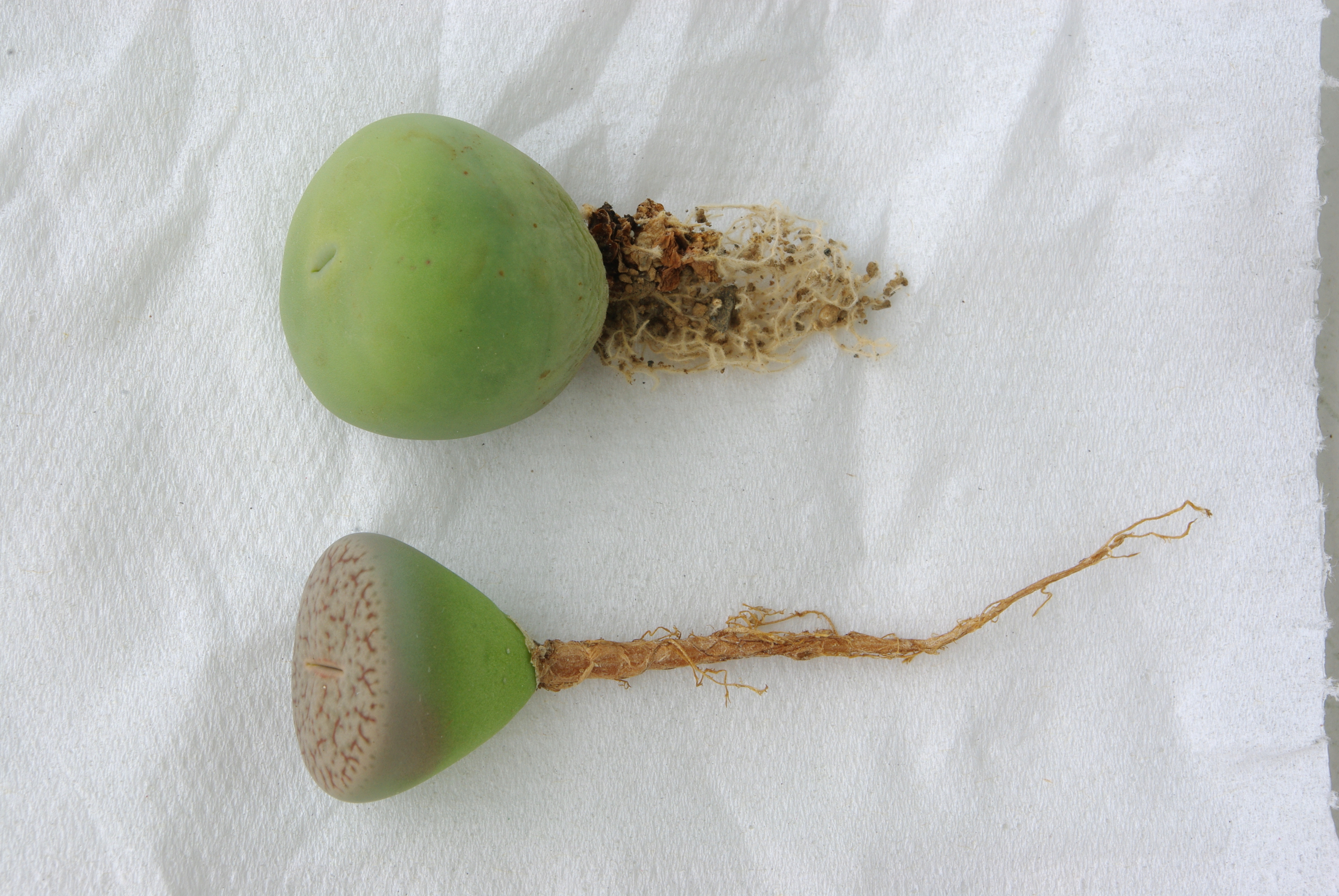
Conophytum pageae (top) and Lithops pseudotruncatella (bottom)

== Description ==
Leaves are thick, and similar to that of the rest of the genus Lithops. The leaves are paired in twos, and the plant as a whole does not grow larger than 5 cm in height. They are grey to pale brown in color with branched marbling on the top. Its flowers are yellow in color and not more than 4 cm in diameter.
