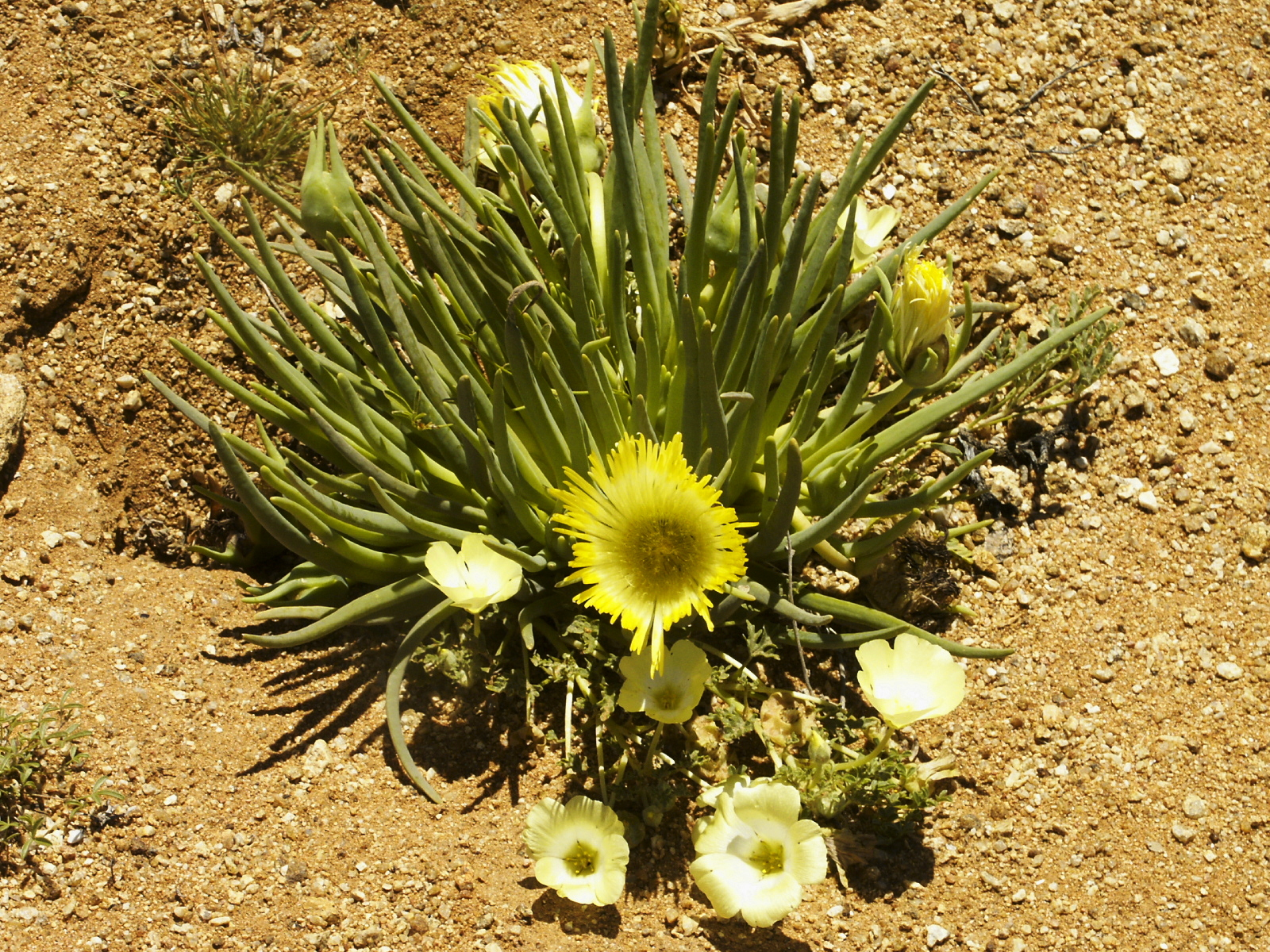
- Conicosia pugioniformis

Scientific classification
- Kingdom: Plantae
- Clade: Tracheophytes
- Clade: Angiosperms
- Clade: Eudicots
- Order: Caryophyllales
- Family: Aizoaceae
- Subfamily: Ruschioideae
- Tribe: Apatesieae
- Genus: Conicosia; N.E.Br.

Species
- Conicosia elongata (Haw.) Schwantes; Conicosia pugioniformis (L.) N.E.Br.

Synonyms
- Herrea Schwantes

= Conicosia =

Genus of succulents

Conicosia is a genus of succulent plants in the ice plant family native to the Cape Provinces of South Africa. They are known commonly as narrow-leafed ice plants. These are relatively short-lived perennials with underground stems and tentacle-shaped, dull-pointed triangular leaves. They bear large tubular flowers often exceeding 10 centimeters in width, with up to 250 fringelike petals arranged in a ring around a center with hundreds of stamens. The fruit is a capsule which opens when it gets wet, slowly releasing the hundreds of tiny seeds as they fall out of its drying flesh.

Two species are accepted.

- Conicosia elongata (Haw.) Schwantes
- Conicosia pugioniformis (L.) N.E.Br.
