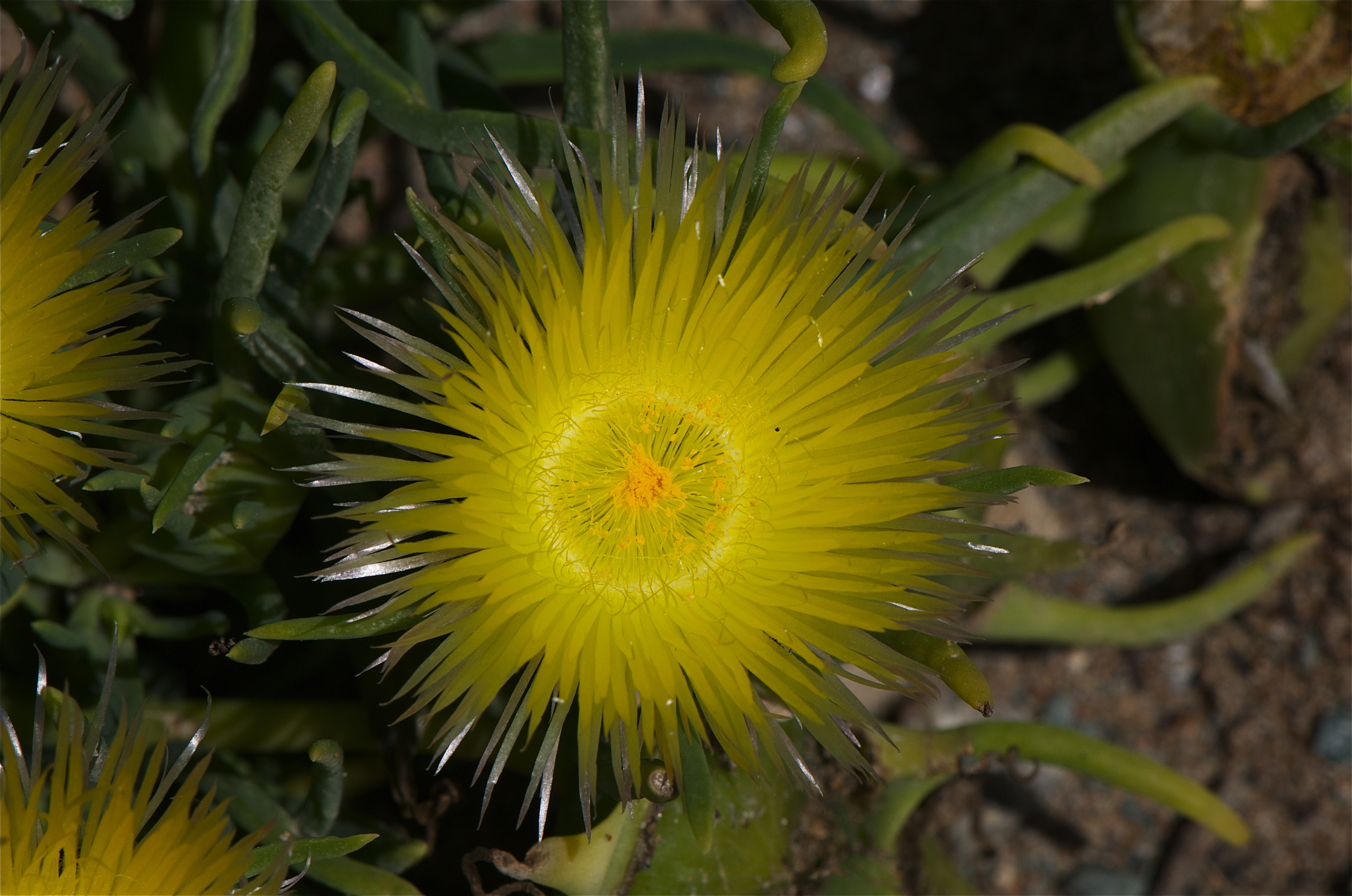

Scientific classification
- Kingdom: Plantae
- Clade: Tracheophytes
- Clade: Angiosperms
- Clade: Eudicots
- Order: Caryophyllales
- Family: Aizoaceae
- Genus: Conicosia
- Species: C. pugioniformis

Binomial name
- Conicosia pugioniformis (L.) N.E.Br.

= Conicosia pugioniformis =

Species of succulent

Conicosia pugioniformis is a species of succulent plant in the ice plant family known by the common names narrow-leaved iceplant and pigroot. It is native to South Africa and it is known on other continents as an introduced species and sometimes a noxious weed. It is an invasive species on the Central Coast of California, where it is a minor threat to native coastal vegetation, although not as harmful as other species of invasive iceplant. This is a short-lived perennial herb growing from an underground caudex. It can sprout vegetatively from the caudex if its aboveground parts are destroyed. The fingerlike leaves are fleshy, gray-green, hairless, and up to 20 centimeters long. The inflorescence is a solitary, malodorous flower up to 8 centimeters wide. It has rings of up to 250 thin petals.
