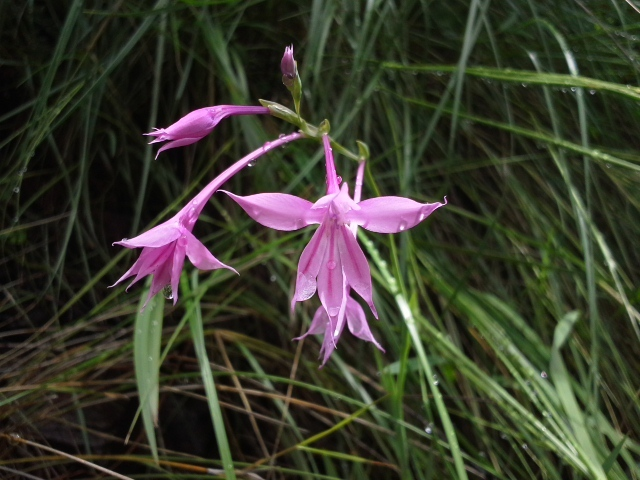

Scientific classification
- Kingdom: Plantae
- Clade: Tracheophytes
- Clade: Angiosperms
- Clade: Monocots
- Order: Asparagales
- Family: Iridaceae
- Genus: Radinosiphon
- Species: R. leptostachya

Binomial name
- Radinosiphon leptostachya (Baker) N.E.Br., 1932

= Radinosiphon leptostachya =

Species of flowering plant

Radinosiphon leptostachya is a perennial flowering plant belonging to the family Iridaceae.
