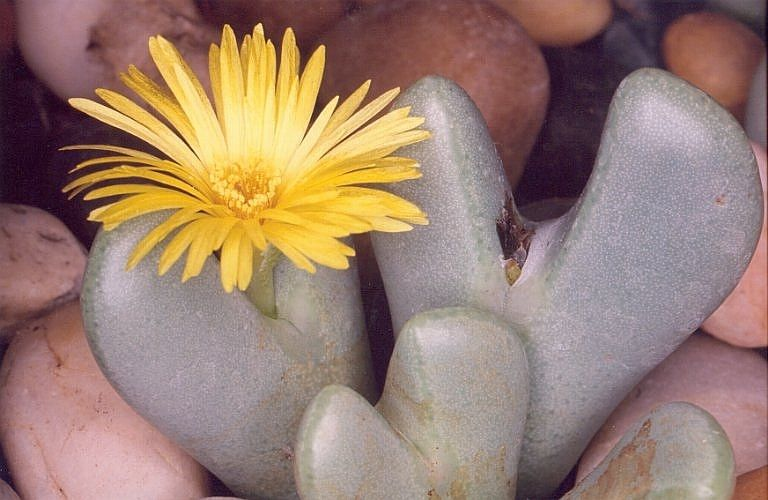

Scientific classification
- Kingdom: Plantae
- Clade: Tracheophytes
- Clade: Angiosperms
- Clade: Eudicots
- Order: Caryophyllales
- Family: Aizoaceae
- Subfamily: Ruschioideae
- Tribe: Ruschieae
- Genus: Conophytum; N.E.Br.

Type species
- Conophytum minutum (Haw.) N.E. Br.

Species
- See here

Synonyms
- Berresfordia L.Bolus; Conophyton Haw.; Derenbergia Schwantes; Herreanthus Schwantes; Ophthalmophyllum Dinter & Schwantes

= Conophytum =

Genus of succulent plants from southern Africa

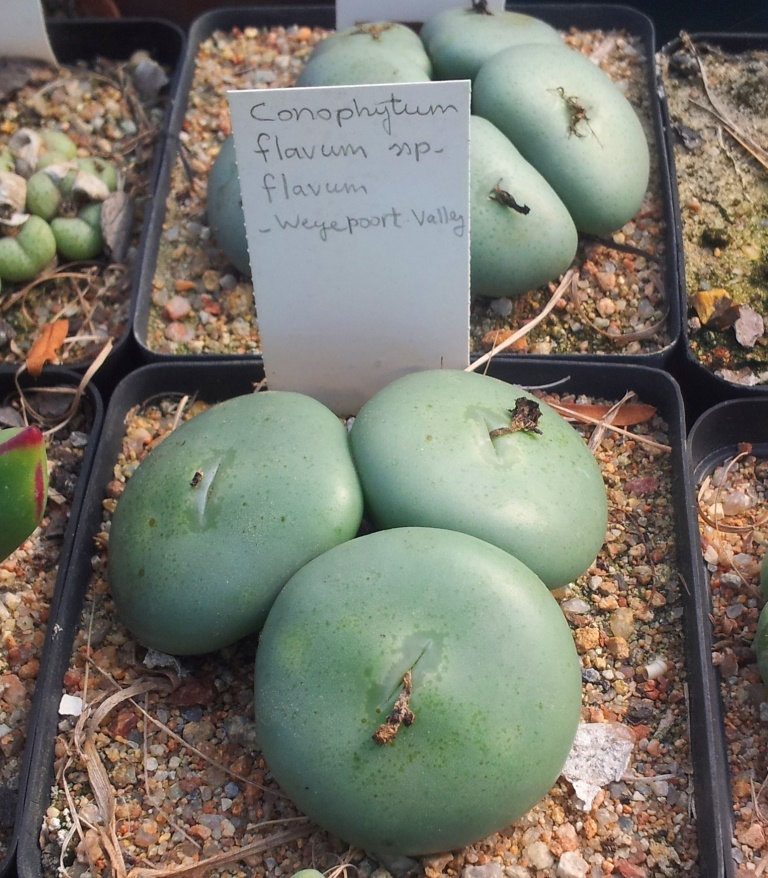
Conophytum flavum

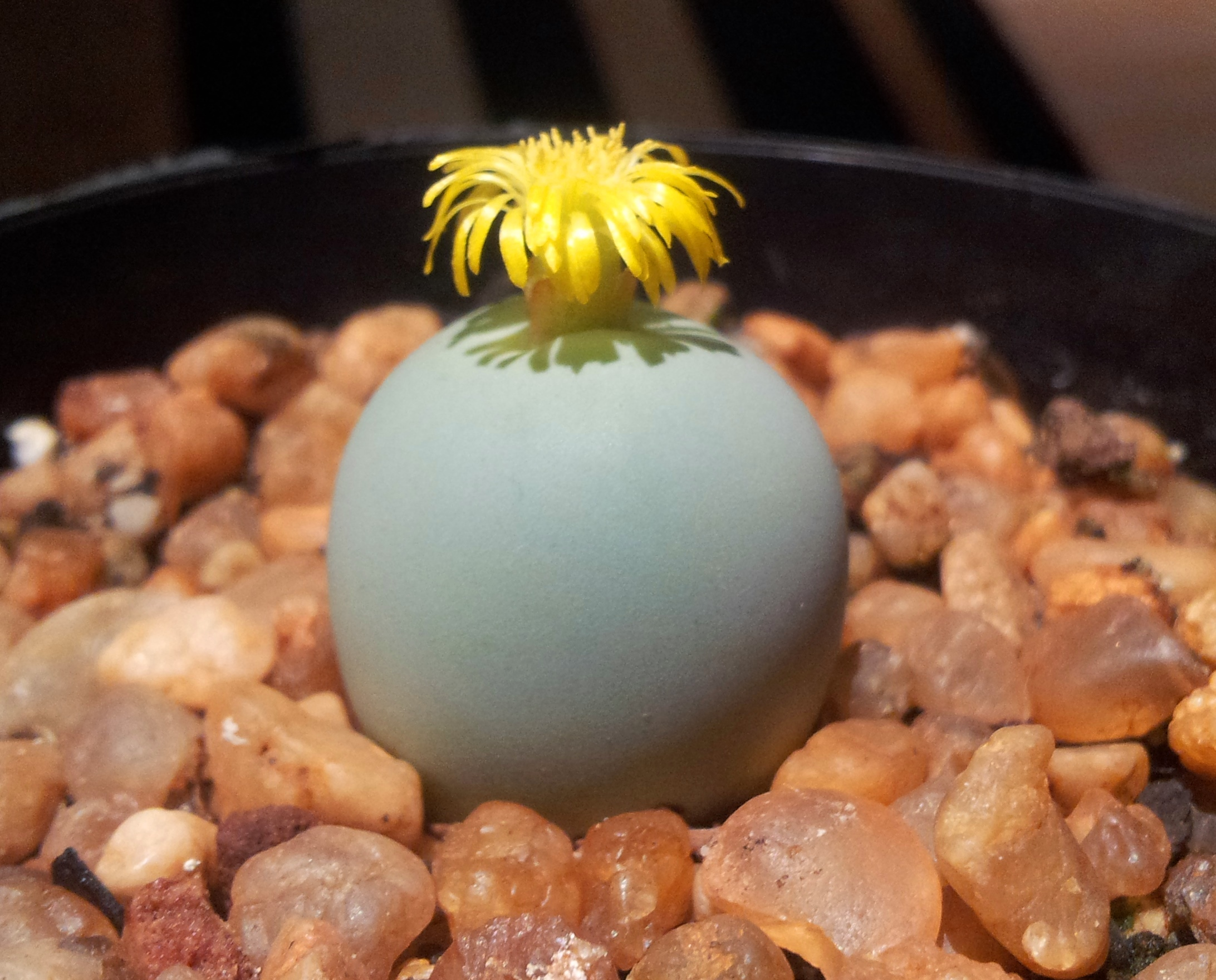
Conophytum calculus

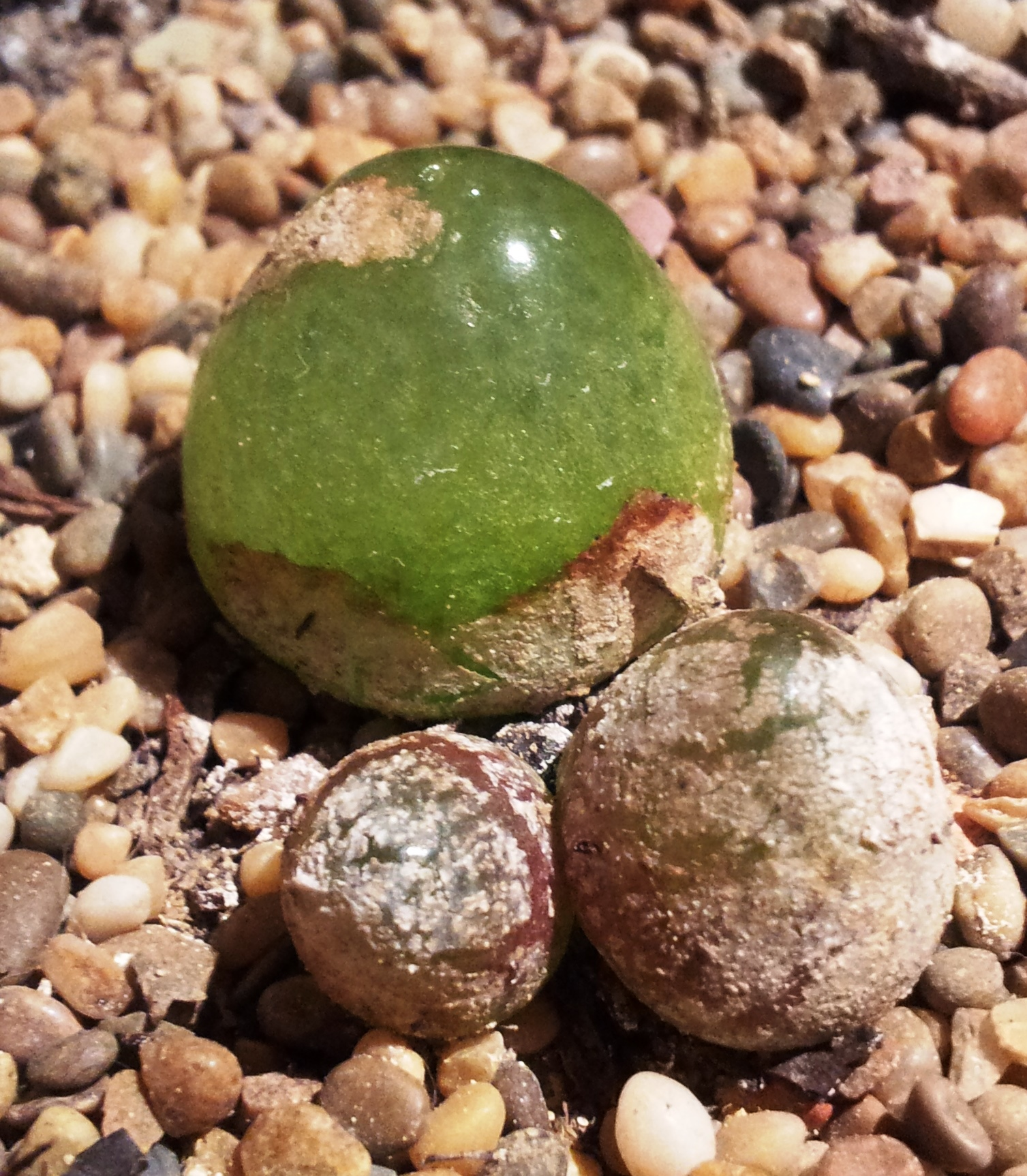
Conophytum burgeri

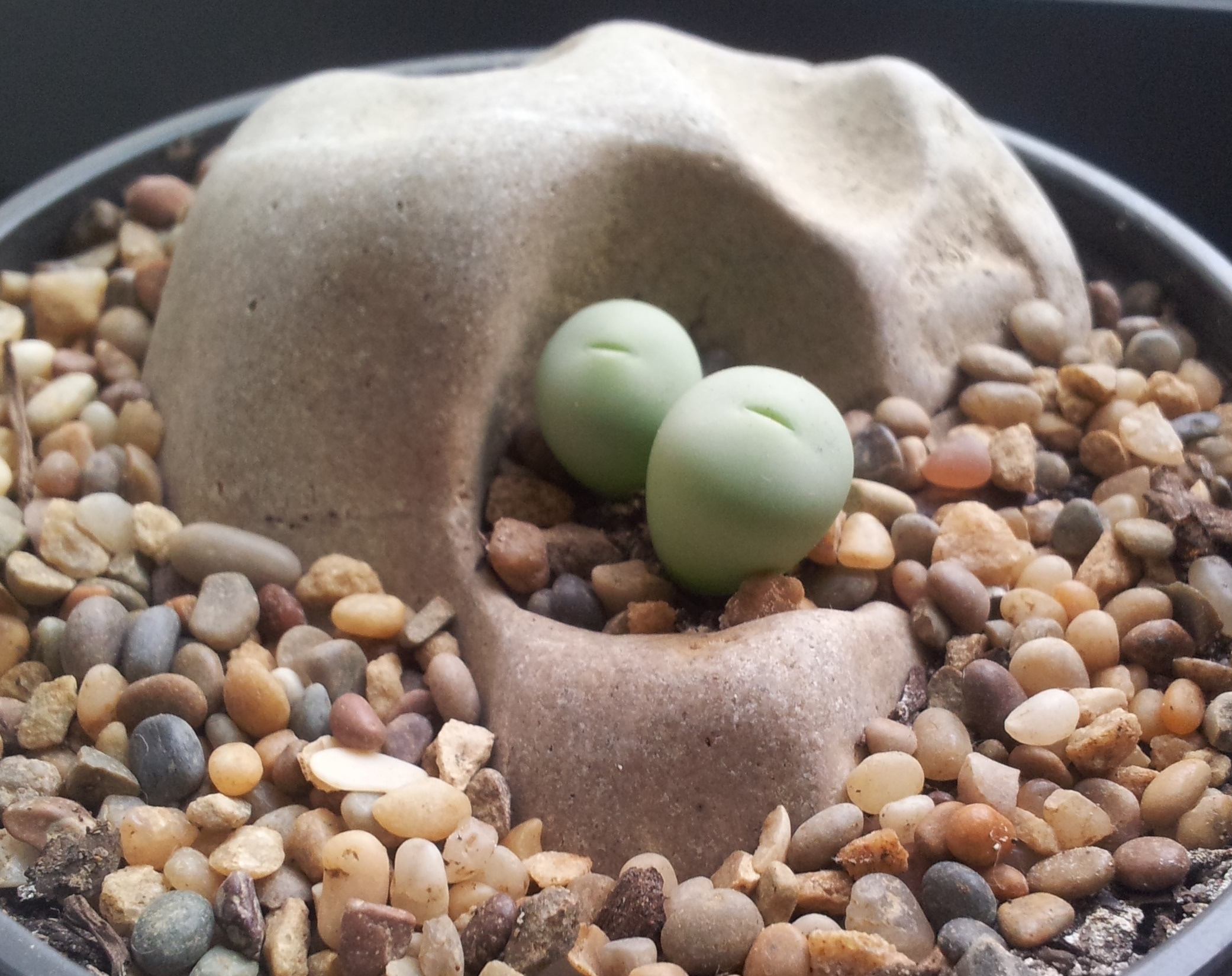
Conophytum breve

Conophytum is a genus of succulent plants that belong to the family Aizoaceae. They are native to southern Namibia and the western and southern Cape Provinces of South Africa. The name is derived from the Latin conus (cone) and Greek phytum (plant). The plants are also known as knopies (buttons in Afrikaans), waterblasies (water blisters in Afrikaans), sphaeroids, conos, cone plants, dumplings, or button plants.

== Description ==
Conophytum species are dwarf cushion-forming or single-bodied succulents. Members of the genus are tiny plants with succulent leaves ranging from 1/4" to 2" in length. These leaves are partially or entirely fused along their centers. Each leaf pair (together referred to as a body) ranges in shape from "bilobed" to spherical to ovoid to tubular to conical. Some species have epidermal windows on the top of their leaves. To the naked eye the epidermis ranges from very smooth to slightly rough to hairy, depending on the microscopic epidermal cell shape and structure. In their normal, natural state each stem has only one pair of leaves at a time though one plant may have dozens of stems and thus dozens of leaf pairs. When very heavy rains come to their native habitat they may grow luxuriantly and develop two leaf pairs per stem simultaneously; this is called "stacking up" of the leaves. The plants grow very slowly; depending on the species, a 50-year-old plant might not be bigger than a walnut.

== Taxonomy ==
The genus is sometimes wrongly referred to as Conophyton, the name that Adrian Hardy Haworth suggested in 1821: "If this section proves to be a genus, the name of Conophyton would be apt". However, this was too tentative to establish a validly published generic name and also, Haworth himself neither adopted it nor accepted the genus. The genus was neither recognised nor validly named until the name Conophytum was published 101 years later. It was published by Nicholas Edward Brown in 1922. The lectotype Conophytum minutum (Haw.) N.E. Br. was designated in 1951.

=== Species ===
106 species are accepted.

- Conophytum achabense S.A.Hammer
- Conophytum acutum L.Bolus
- Conophytum albiflorum (Rawé) S.A.Hammer
- Conophytum angelicae (Dinter & Schwantes) N.E.Br.
- Conophytum armianum S.A.Hammer
- Conophytum armianum S.A.Hammer
- Conophytum auriflorum Tischer
- Conophytum bachelorum S.A.Hammer
- Conophytum bicarinatum L.Bolus
- Conophytum bilobum (Marloth) N.E.Br.
- Conophytum blandum L.Bolus
- Conophytum bolusiae Schwantes
- Conophytum breve N.E.Br.
- Conophytum brunneum S.A.Hammer
- Conophytum bruynsii S.A.Hammer
- Conophytum burgeri L.Bolus
- Conophytum buysianum A.R.Mitch. & S.A.Hammer
- Conophytum calculus (A.Berger) N.E.Br.
- Conophytum caroli Lavis
- Conophytum carpianum L.Bolus
- Conophytum chauviniae (Schwantes) S.A.Hammer
- Conophytum chrisocruxum S.A.Hammer
- Conophytum chrisolum S.A.Hammer
- Conophytum comptonii N.E.Br.
- Conophytum concavum L.Bolus
- Conophytum confusum A.J.Young, Rodgerson, S.A.Hammer & Opel
- Conophytum crateriforme A.J.Young, Rodgerson, Harrower & S.A.Hammer
- Conophytum cubicum Pavelka
- Conophytum × cupreiflorum Tischer
- Conophytum depressum Lavis
- Conophytum devium G.D.Rowley
- Conophytum ectypum N.E.Br.
- Conophytum ernstii S.A.Hammer
- Conophytum fibuliforme (Haw.) N.E.Br.
- Conophytum ficiforme (Haw.) N.E.Br.
- Conophytum flavum N.E.Br.
- Conophytum francoiseae (S.A.Hammer) S.A.Hammer
- Conophytum fraternum (N.E.Br.) N.E.Br.
- Conophytum friedrichiae (Dinter) Schwantes
- Conophytum frutescens Schwantes
- Conophytum fulleri L.Bolus
- Conophytum globosum (N.E.Br.) N.E.Br.
- Conophytum halenbergense (Dinter & Schwantes) N.E.Br.
- Conophytum hammeri G.Will. & H.C.Kenn.
- Conophytum hanae Pavelka
- Conophytum herreanthus S.A.Hammer
- Conophytum hians N.E.Br.
- Conophytum hyracis S.A.Hammer
- Conophytum irmae S.A.Hammer & Barnhill
- Conophytum jarmilae Halda
- Conophytum joubertii Lavis
- Conophytum jucundum (N.E.Br.) N.E.Br.
- Conophytum khamiesbergense (L.Bolus) Schwantes
- Conophytum klinghardtense Rawé
- Conophytum limpidum S.A.Hammer
- Conophytum lithopsoides L.Bolus
- Conophytum loeschianum Tischer
- Conophytum longibracteatum L.Bolus
- Conophytum longum N.E.Br.
- Conophytum luckhoffii Lavis
- Conophytum lydiae (H.Jacobsen) G.D.Rowley
- Conophytum marginatum Lavis
- Conophytum × marnierianum Tischer & H.Jacobsen
- Conophytum maughanii N.E.Br.
- Conophytum meyeri N.E.Br.
- Conophytum minimum (Haw.) N.E.Br.
- Conophytum minusculum (N.E.Br.) N.E.Br.
- Conophytum minutum (Haw.) N.E.Br.
- Conophytum mirabile A.R.Mitch. & S.A.Hammer
- Conophytum obcordellum (Haw.) N.E.Br.
- Conophytum obscurum N.E.Br.
- Conophytum pageae (N.E.Br.) N.E.Br.
- Conophytum pellucidum Schwantes
- Conophytum phoeniceum S.A.Hammer
- Conophytum piluliforme (N.E.Br.) N.E.Br.
- Conophytum pium S.A.Hammer
- Conophytum praesectum N.E.Br.
- Conophytum pubescens (Tischer) G.D.Rowley
- Conophytum pubicalyx Lavis
- Conophytum quaesitum (N.E.Br.) N.E.Br.
- Conophytum ratum S.A.Hammer
- Conophytum reconditum A.R.Mitch.
- Conophytum regale Lavis
- Conophytum ricardianum Losch & Tischler
- Conophytum roodiae N.E.Br.
- Conophytum rugosum S.A.Hammer
- Conophytum saxetanum (N.E.Br.) N.E.Br.
- Conophytum schlechteri Schwantes
- Conophytum semivestitum L.Bolus
- Conophytum smaleorum Rodgerson & A.J.Young
- Conophytum smorenskaduense de Boer
- Conophytum stephanii Schwantes
- Conophytum stevens-jonesianum L.Bolus
- Conophytum subfenestratum Schwantes
- Conophytum subterraneum Smale & T.Jacobs
- Conophytum swanepoelianum Rawé
- Conophytum tantillum N.E.Br.
- Conophytum taylorianum (Dinter & Schwantes) N.E.Br.
- Conophytum truncatum (Thunb.) N.E.Br.
- Conophytum turrigerum (N.E.Br.) N.E.Br.
- Conophytum uviforme (Haw.) N.E.Br.
- Conophytum vanheerdei Tischer
- Conophytum velutinum Schwantes
- Conophytum verrucosum (Lavis) G.D.Rowley
- Conophytum violaciflorum Schick & Tischer
- Conophytum wettsteinii (A.Berger) N.E.Br.
- Conophytum youngii Rodgerson

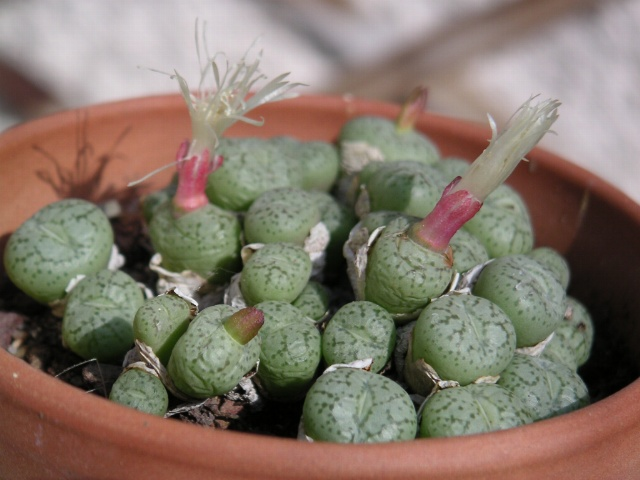
Conophytum seitubum

== Conservation ==
Recently several species have been threatened with extinction due to mining and poaching from the wild for the black market. These plants are mainly sold to collectors in Asian countries, where there has been a high demand for them. In June 2021, police arrested a dozen men at a farm in the Western Cape for possession of 4,000 Conophytum acutum; this came as a surprise as scientists thought there were only about a thousand of the plants in the wild and none on the farm in question. Teams at the Kirstenbosch Botanical Garden are collecting and categorising seeds from Conophytum and other succulents in partnership with the Millennium Seed Bank.

== Cultivation ==
Several species of Conophytum are found in cultivation. Conophytum grows best between the temperatures 15 °C (59 °F) and 25 °C (77 °F). When the plant is not under optimal temperatures, its leaves will curl and lose color. If grown in the Northern Hemisphere, the plants should not be watered from the end of March to late July. During this time, leaves will dry and protect the newer leaves. It is recommended to water Conophytum every week from late July/early August until mid October, where watering should be reduced to once every three weeks throughout winter. Weekly watering can resume when the temperature increases in February.
