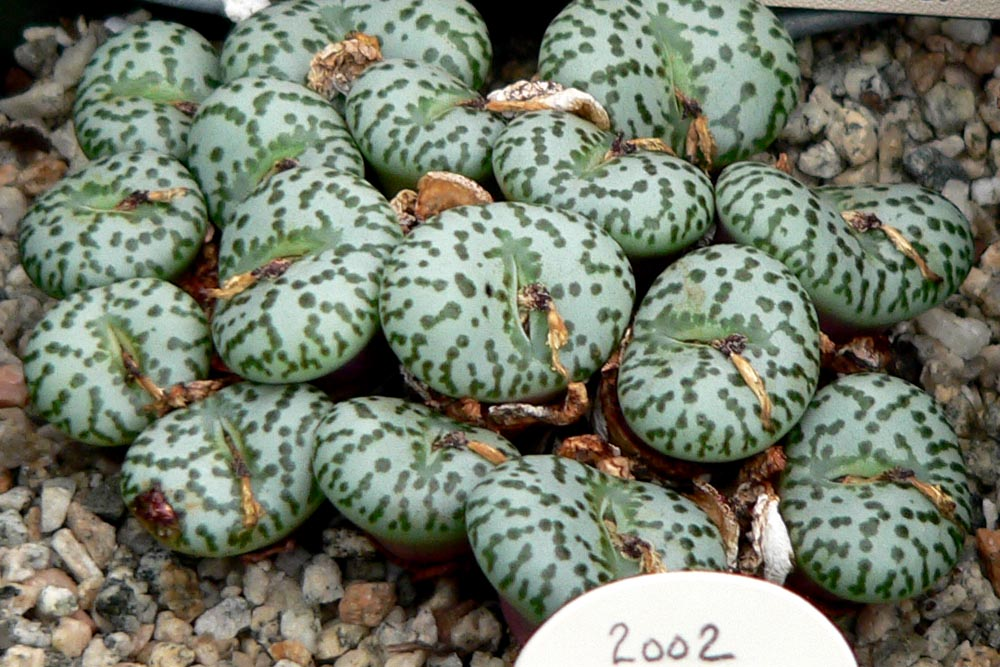

Conservation status
- Near Threatened (IUCN 3.1)
- CITES Appendix III

Scientific classification
- Kingdom: Plantae
- Clade: Tracheophytes
- Clade: Angiosperms
- Clade: Eudicots
- Order: Caryophyllales
- Family: Aizoaceae
- Genus: Conophytum
- Species: C. obcordellum

Binomial name
- Conophytum obcordellum (Haw.) N.E.Br.

Synonyms
- Mesembryanthemum obcordellum Haw.

= Conophytum obcordellum =

Species of succulent

Conophytum obcordellum is a species of flowering plant in the family Aizoaceae, native to the Western Cape of South Africa. It is a small clump-forming succulent, growing to 10 cm tall and 1 m broad, forming glossy grey pebble-shaped growths, heavily marked with dots and lines. Daisy-like, silky white or pink night-scented flowers are borne on mature plants in spring (or late summer in the Northern Hemisphere).

Conophytum obcordellum is cultivated as an ornamental. In temperate zones it must normally be grown under glass, as it does not tolerate freezing temperatures. Plants require similar conditions to cactus plants, grown in a free-draining medium with full sun and low moisture levels. This plant has gained the Royal Horticultural Society's Award of Garden Merit.
