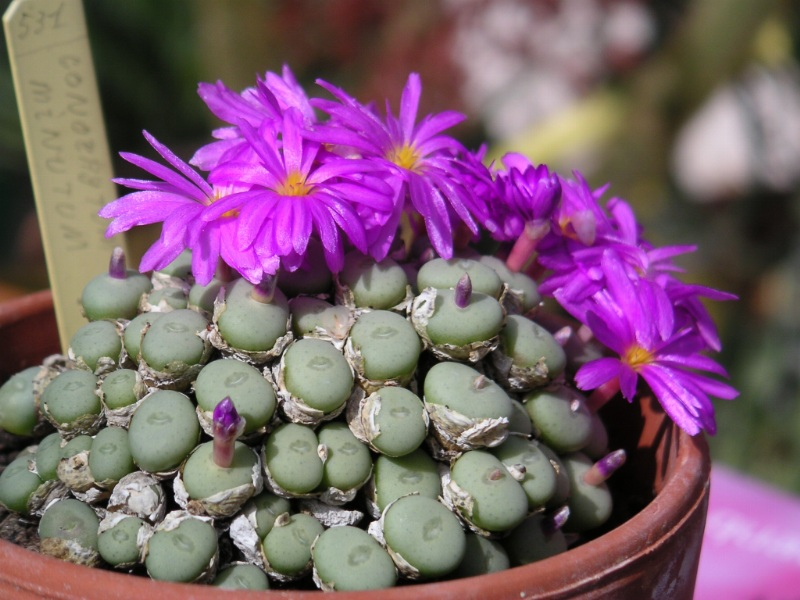
- In bloom

Conservation status
- Near Threatened (IUCN 3.1)
- CITES Appendix III

Scientific classification
- Kingdom: Plantae
- Clade: Tracheophytes
- Clade: Angiosperms
- Clade: Eudicots
- Order: Caryophyllales
- Family: Aizoaceae
- Genus: Conophytum
- Species: C. minutum

Binomial name
- Conophytum minutum (Haw.) N.E.Br.

Synonyms
- Conophytum sellatum Tischer; Mesembryanthemum minutum Haw.; Mesembryanthemum thecatum N.E.Br.

= Conophytum minutum =

Species of flowering plant

Conophytum minutum, called the lesser dumpling, is a species of flowering plant in the genus Conophytum, native to the western Cape Provinces of South Africa. It has gained the Royal Horticultural Society's Award of Garden Merit.

== Subtaxa ==
The following varieties are currently accepted:

- Conophytum minutum var. lisabeliae S.A.Hammer
