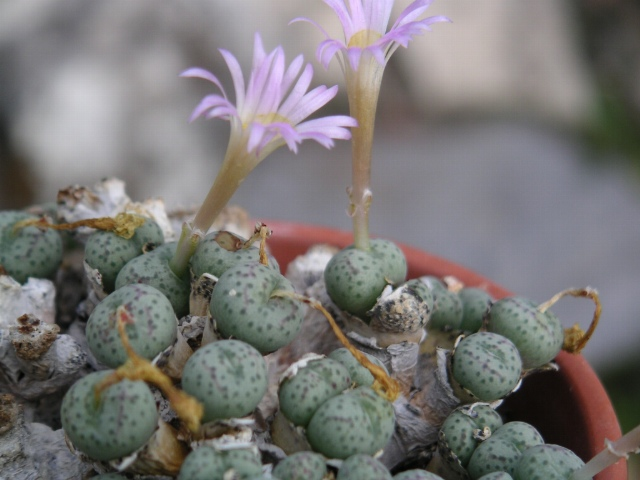
- Conophytum jucundum with flowers

Conservation status
- Endangered (IUCN 3.1)
- CITES Appendix III

Scientific classification
- Kingdom: Plantae
- Clade: Tracheophytes
- Clade: Angiosperms
- Clade: Eudicots
- Order: Caryophyllales
- Family: Aizoaceae
- Genus: Conophytum
- Species: C. jucundum

Binomial name
- Conophytum jucundum (N.E.Br.) N.E.Br.

= Conophytum jucundum =

Species of succulent

Conophytum jucundum is a species of succulent plants belonging to the family Aizoaceae. As its synonym Conophytum gratum, the pleasing cone plant, it has gained the Royal Horticultural Society's Award of Garden Merit.

== Etymology ==
The genus name is derived from the Latin "conus" (cone) and Greek "phyto" (plant), while the species Latin name jucundum means pleasant, jocund.

== Description ==
Conophytum jucundum are dwarf plants with small succulent evergreen leaves, forming in their development small colonies. These plants can reach a height of 6–15 cm (2.4–5.9 in), grow in the form of rounded stones and hide themselves among the rocks and in crevices, The flowers are pink or pale pink and the flowering period extends from late Summer to mid Fall.

== Distribution and habitat ==
This species grows in southwestern Namibia and the northwestern Cape Provinces of South Africa at an elevation of 700 to 1100 m.

== Synonyms ==
- Conophytum jucundum subsp. jucundum
- Mesembryanthemum jucundum N.E.Br. (1920)
- Conophytum admiraalii L.Bolus (1965)
- Conophytum geyeri L.Bolus (1963)
- Conophytum gratum (N.E.Br.) N.E.Br.
- Mesembryanthemum gratum N.E.Br. (1920)
- Conophytum jacobsenianum Tischer (1956)
- Conophytum longistylum N.E.Br. (1930)
- Conophytum maximum Tischer (1957)
- Conophytum orbicum N.E.Br. ex Tischer (1955)
- Conophytum praegratum Tischer (1954)
- Conophytum rarum N.E.Br. (1933)
- Conophytum robustum Tischer

== Bibliography ==
- II.Handbook succulent plants: Aizoaceae A-E : 150-151 (2001).
- Gibbs Russell, G. E., W. G. Welman, E. Reitief, K. L. Immelman, G. Germishuizen, B. J. Pienaar, M. v. Wyk & A. Nicholas. 1987. List of species of southern African plants. Mem. Bot. Surv. S. Africa 2(1–2): 1–152(pt. 1), 1–270(pt. 2).
