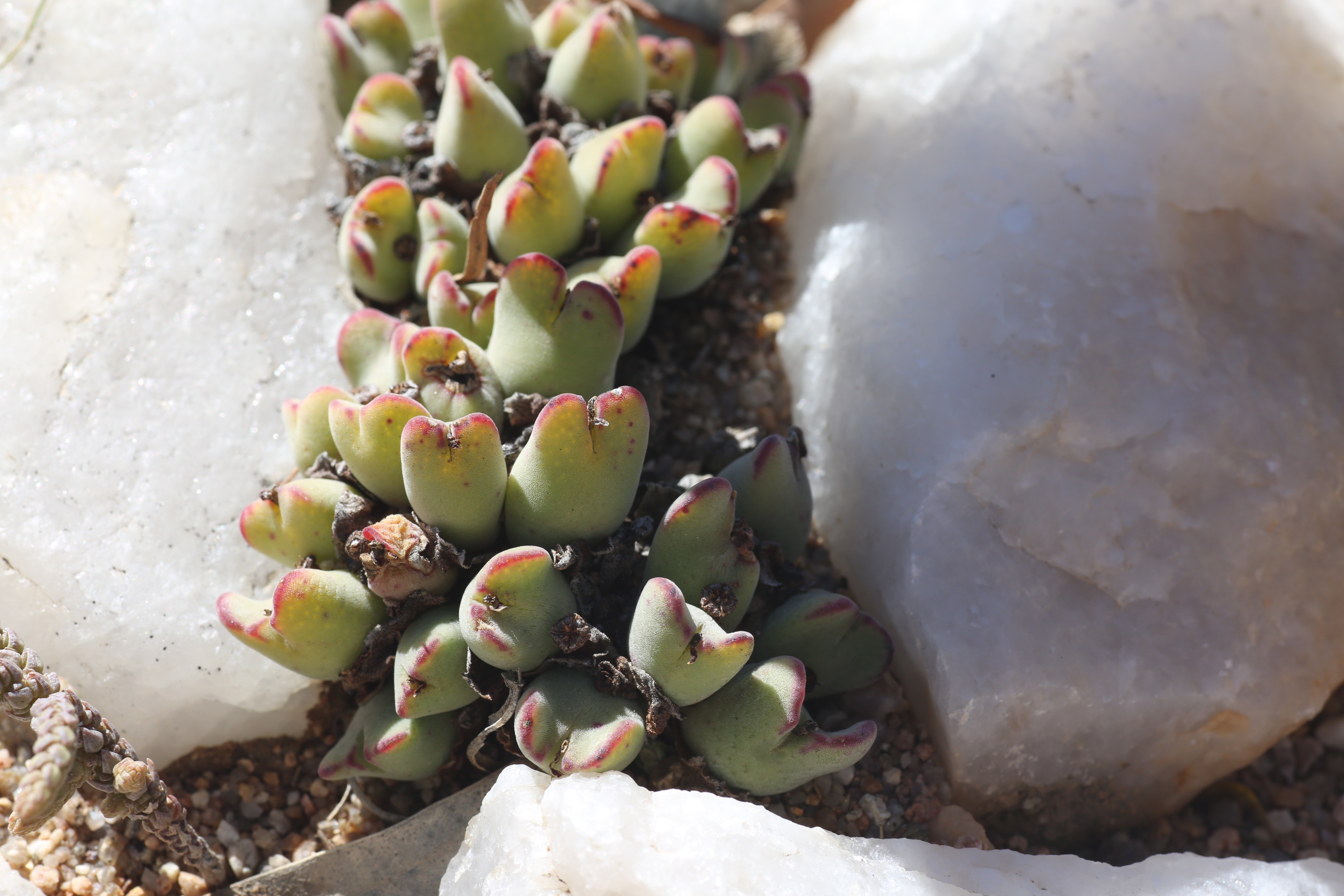
- C. bilobum growing in habitat in Namaqua National Park

Conservation status
- Vulnerable (IUCN 3.1)
- CITES Appendix III

Scientific classification
- Kingdom: Plantae
- Clade: Tracheophytes
- Clade: Angiosperms
- Clade: Eudicots
- Order: Caryophyllales
- Family: Aizoaceae
- Genus: Conophytum
- Species: C. bilobum

Binomial name
- Conophytum bilobum (Marloth) N.E.Br.

Synonyms
- List: Conophytum absimile L.Bolus; Conophytum aequale L.Bolus; Conophytum albescens N.E.Br.; Conophytum ampliatum L.Bolus; Conophytum amplum L.Bolus; Conophytum andausanum N.E.Br.; Conophytum angustum N.E.Br.; Conophytum anomalum L.Bolus; Conophytum apiatum (N.E.Br.) N.E.Br.; Conophytum apiculatum N.E.Br.; Conophytum approximatum Lavis; Conophytum asperulum L.Bolus; Conophytum auctum N.E.Br.; Conophytum australe L.Bolus; Conophytum barkerae L.Bolus; Conophytum brevisectum L.Bolus; Conophytum cauliferum N.E.Br.; Conophytum christiansenianum L.Bolus; Conophytum citrinum L.Bolus; Conophytum compressum N.E.Br.; Conophytum conradii L.Bolus; Conophytum convexum L.Bolus; Conophytum cordatum Schick & Tischer; Conophytum coriaceum L.Bolus; Conophytum crassum L.Bolus; Conophytum curtum L.Bolus; Conophytum dennisii N.E.Br.; Conophytum difforme L.Bolus; Conophytum dilatatum Tischer; Conophytum dissimile L.Bolus; Conophytum distans L.Bolus; Conophytum divaricatum N.E.Br.; Conophytum diversum N.E.Br.; Conophytum dolomiticum Tischer; Conophytum ecarinatum L.Bolus; Conophytum elishae (N.E.Br.) N.E.Br.; Conophytum excisum L.Bolus; Conophytum exsertum N.E.Br.; Conophytum gonapense L.Bolus; Conophytum grandiflorum L.Bolus; Conophytum inclusum L.Bolus; Conophytum incurvum N.E.Br.; Conophytum indefinitum L.Bolus; Conophytum insigne L.Bolus; Conophytum klipbokbergense L.Bolus; Conophytum lacteum L.Bolus; Conophytum largum L.Bolus; Conophytum lavisianum L.Bolus; Conophytum laxipetalum N.E.Br.; Conophytum lekkersingense L.Bolus; Conophytum leucanthum Lavis; Conophytum linearilucidum L.Bolus; Conophytum markoetterae Schwantes; Conophytum meyerae Schwantes; Conophytum muscosipapillatum Lavis; Conophytum nelianum Schwantes; Conophytum noisabisense L.Bolus; Conophytum nutaboiense Tischer; Conophytum obtusum N.E.Br.; Conophytum ovatum L.Bolus; Conophytum parvulum L.Bolus; Conophytum philipii L.Bolus; Conophytum piriforme L.Bolus; Conophytum plenum N.E.Br.; Conophytum pluriforme L.Bolus; Conophytum pole-evansii N.E.Br.; Conophytum proximum L.Bolus; Conophytum recisum N.E.Br.; Conophytum simile N.E.Br.; Conophytum simplum N.E.Br.; Conophytum sitzlerianum Schwantes; Conophytum smithersii L.Bolus; Conophytum sororium N.E.Br.; Conophytum springbokense N.E.Br.; Conophytum strictum L.Bolus; Conophytum stylosum (N.E.Br.) Tischer; Conophytum subacutum L.Bolus; Conophytum subcylindricum L.Bolus; Conophytum subtenue L.Bolus; Conophytum supremum L.Bolus; Conophytum tectum N.E.Br.; Conophytum tumidum N.E.Br.; Conophytum umdausense L.Bolus; Conophytum variabile L.Bolus; Conophytum vlakmynense L.Bolus; Derenbergia apiata (N.E.Br.) Schwantes; Derenbergia biloba (Marloth) Schwantes; Derenbergia caulifera (N.E.Br.) Schwantes; Derenbergia elishae (N.E.Br.) Schwantes; Mesembryanthemum apiatum N.E.Br.; Mesembryanthemum bilobum Marloth; Mesembryanthemum elishae N.E.Br.; Mesembryanthemum stylosum N.E.Br.

= Conophytum bilobum =

Genus of flowering plants

Conophytum bilobum is a plant in the family Aizoaceae, native to southern South Africa. It blooms in autumn. It is scentless and grows to a height of 7 cm (2.8 in). The specific epithet bilobum comes from the two-lobed bodies these plants possess.

== Subspecies ==
Currently accepted subspecies include:

- Conophytum bilobum subsp. altum (L.Bolus) S.A.Hammer
- Conophytum bilobum subsp. claviferens S.A.Hammer
- Conophytum bilobum subsp. gracilistylum (L.Bolus) S.A.Hammer
