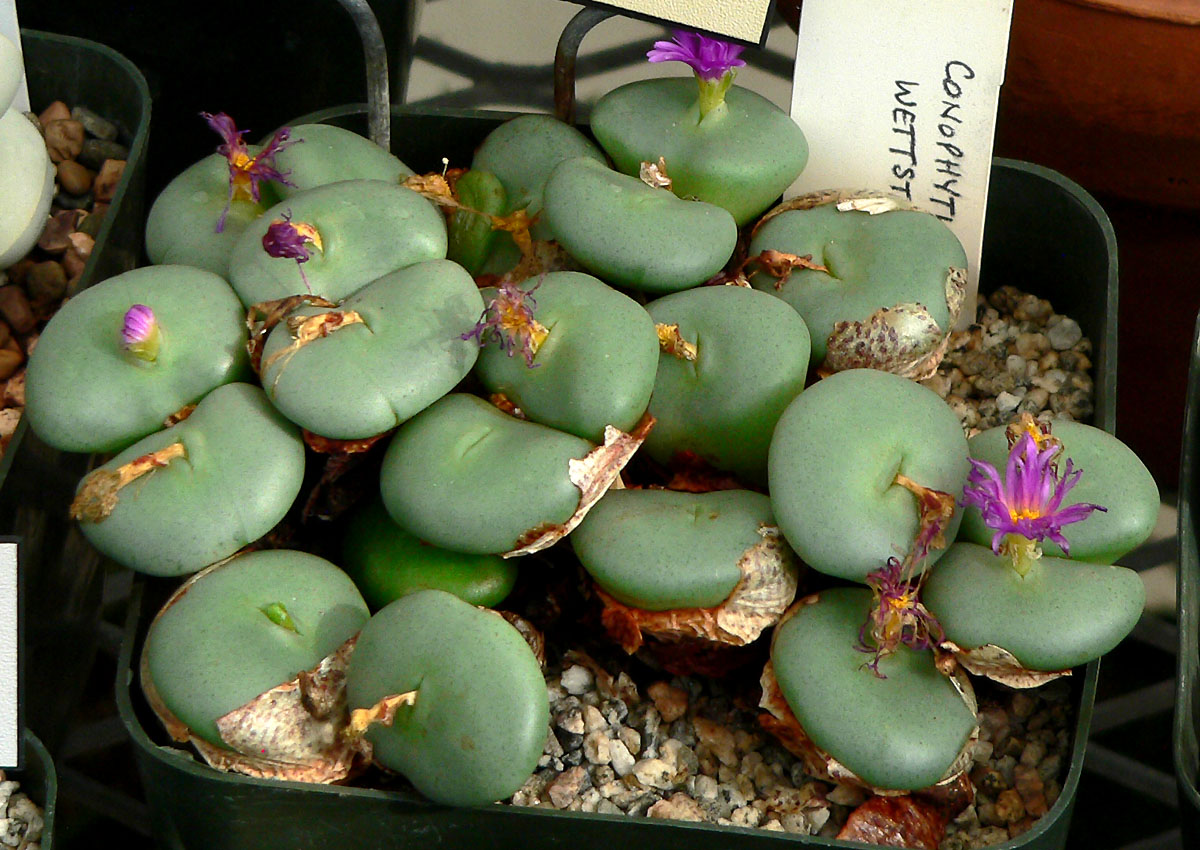
- At the University of California Botanical Garden

Conservation status
- Critically Endangered (IUCN 3.1)
- CITES Appendix III

Scientific classification
- Kingdom: Plantae
- Clade: Embryophytes
- Clade: Tracheophytes
- Clade: Spermatophytes
- Clade: Angiosperms
- Clade: Eudicots
- Order: Caryophyllales
- Family: Aizoaceae
- Genus: Conophytum
- Species: C. wettsteinii

Binomial name
- Conophytum wettsteinii (A.Berger) N.E.Br.

Synonyms
- Conophytum brevipes L.Bolus; Mesembryanthemum wettsteinii A.Berger

= Conophytum wettsteinii =

Species of flowering plant

Conophytum wettsteinii is a species of flowering plant in the genus Conophytum, native to the northwest Cape Provinces of South Africa. It is known to grow in rocky regions, often associated with Crassula elegans. C. wettsteinii is a small groundcover species, which appears stemless with fused leaf-pairs having a obconical shape. This plant relies on winter rains and is mainly dormant in summer months. Best growth occurs when drainage is available, and when only shaded during mid-summer. Propegation can occur through seeds or through cuttings from a full grown plant, where each cutting contains at least 1 head and a fraction of root. It has gained the Royal Horticultural Society's Award of Garden Merit.

== Subtaxa ==
The following subspecies are currently accepted:

- Conophytum wettsteinii subsp. fragile (Tischer) S.A.Hammer
- Conophytum wettsteinii subsp. francoiseae S.A.Hammer
- Conophytum wettsteinii subsp. ruschii (Schwantes) S.A.Hammer
