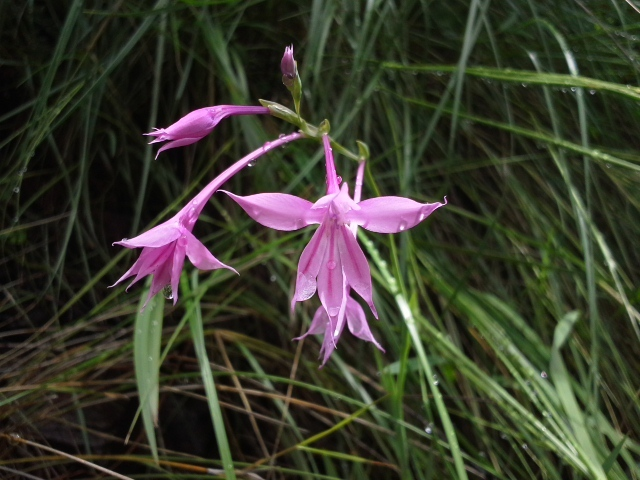
- Radinosiphon leptostachya

Scientific classification
- Kingdom: Plantae
- Clade: Tracheophytes
- Clade: Angiosperms
- Clade: Monocots
- Order: Asparagales
- Family: Iridaceae
- Subfamily: Crocoideae
- Tribe: Croceae
- Genus: Radinosiphon; N.E.Br.

Type species
- Radinosiphon leptostachya (Baker) N.E.Br.

= Radinosiphon =

Genus of flowering plants

Radinosiphon is a genus of flowering plants in the family Iridaceae first described as a genus in 1932. It is native to southern + southeastern Africa.

The genus name is derived from the Greek words radinosus, meaning "slender", and siphon, meaning "tube".

Species

- Radinosiphon leptostachya (Baker) N.E.Br., Trans. Roy. Soc. South Africa 20: 263 (1932) - Tanzania, Malawi, Mozambique, Zimbabwe, Eswatini, northeastern South Africa
- Radinosiphon lomatensis (N.E.Br.) N.E.Br., Trans. Roy. Soc. South Africa 20: 263 (1932) - Mpumalanga Province in South Africa
