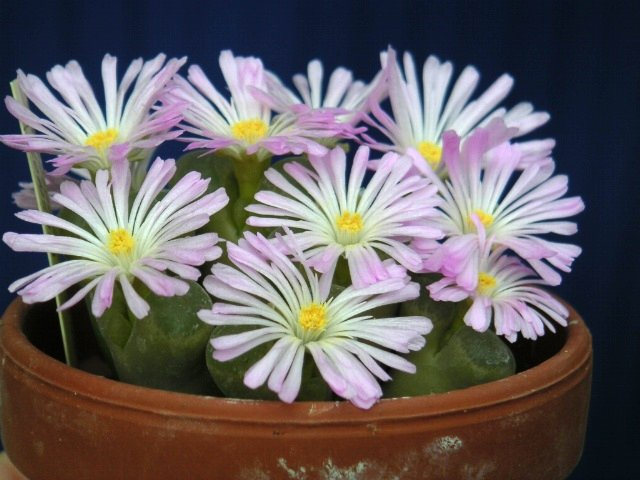
- In bloom

Conservation status
- Vulnerable (IUCN 3.1)
- CITES Appendix III

Scientific classification
- Kingdom: Plantae
- Clade: Tracheophytes
- Clade: Angiosperms
- Clade: Eudicots
- Order: Caryophyllales
- Family: Aizoaceae
- Genus: Conophytum
- Species: C. longum

Binomial name
- Conophytum longum N.E.Br.

Synonyms
- List: Conophytum discretum G.D.Rowley; Conophytum rawei G.D.Rowley; Conophytum restitutum G.D.Rowley; Ophthalmophyllum fulleri Lavis; Ophthalmophyllum herrei Lavis; Ophthalmophyllum longitubum L.Bolus; Ophthalmophyllum longum (N.E.Br.) Tischer; Ophthalmophyllum schlechteri Schwantes ex H.Jacobsen

= Conophytum longum =

Species of flowering plant

Conophytum longum, called the long-leaved cone plant, is a species of flowering plant in the genus Conophytum, native to the western Cape Provinces of South Africa. It has gained the Royal Horticultural Society's Award of Garden Merit.
