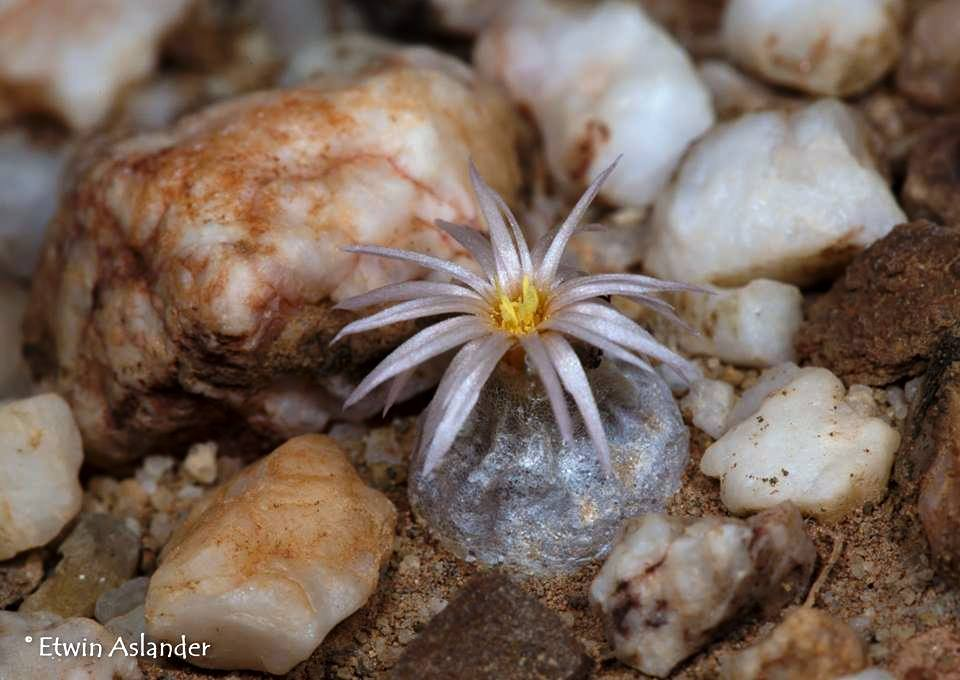
- Conophytum hammeri in habitat.

Conservation status
- Vulnerable (IUCN 3.1)
- CITES Appendix III

Scientific classification
- Kingdom: Plantae
- Clade: Embryophytes
- Clade: Tracheophytes
- Clade: Spermatophytes
- Clade: Angiosperms
- Clade: Eudicots
- Order: Caryophyllales
- Family: Aizoaceae
- Genus: Conophytum
- Species: C. hammeri

Binomial name
- Conophytum hammeri G.Will. & H.C.Kenn.

= Conophytum hammeri =

Species of succulent

Conophytum hammeri is a small, endangered, South African species of succulent plant, of the genus Conophytum.

== Description ==
This species is onion-shaped and single-bodied. It is slow-growing and usually solitary. It forms a protective papery sheath during its dry dormancy. Its pale yellow, nocturnal flowers have 18 to 26 petals. It superficially resembles Conophytum burgeri, in being single-bodied and cone-shaped, and has even been hybridised with this species in cultivation. However C. hammeri is smaller and solitary, and has an obscure translucent window on its summit. Other similar, single-bodied Conophytums of the "Cheshire-Feles" section include Conophytum ratum and Conophytum maughanii.

== Distribution ==
This species is indigenous to the northernmost parts of the Northern Cape Province, South Africa. It was first discovered in the 1990s, on gentle quartz-covered slopes in the eastern Richtersveld.
