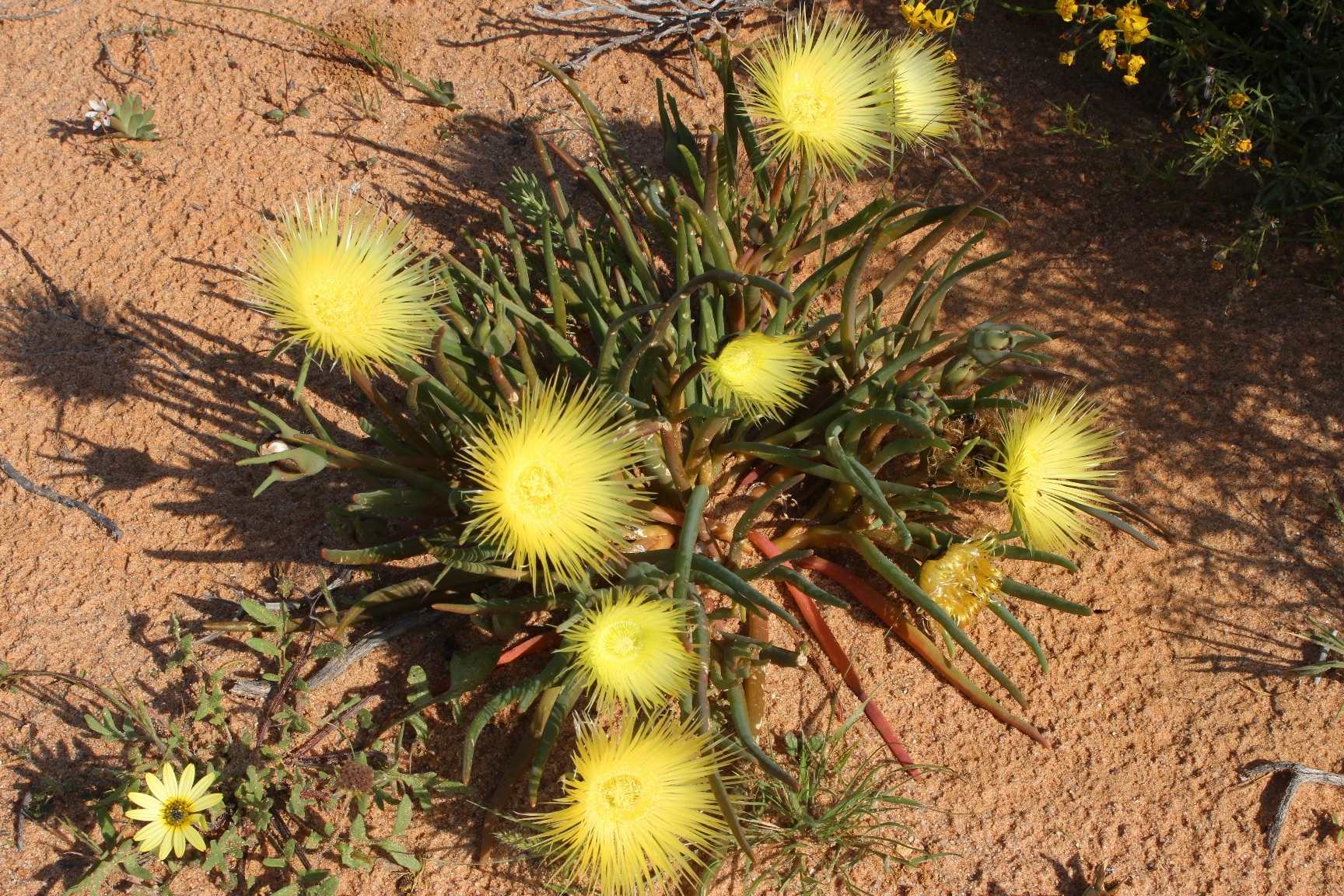

Conservation status
- Least Concern (SANBI Red List)

Scientific classification
- Kingdom: Plantae
- Clade: Tracheophytes
- Clade: Angiosperms
- Clade: Eudicots
- Order: Caryophyllales
- Family: Aizoaceae
- Genus: Conicosia
- Species: C. elongata

Binomial name
- Conicosia elongata (Haw.) Schwantes (1928)

Synonyms
- Conicosia affinis N.E.Br.; Conicosia fusiformis (Haw.) N.E.Br.; Conicosia robusta N.E.Br.; Conicosia roodiae N.E.Br.; Herrea acocksii L.Bolus; Herrea affinis (N.E.Br.) L.Bolus; Herrea alba L.Bolus; Herrea albolutea L.Bolus; Herrea blanda L.Bolus; Herrea brevisepala L.Bolus; Herrea elongata (Haw.) L.Bolus; Herrea excavata L.Bolus; Herrea fusiformis (Haw.) L.Bolus; Herrea grandis L.Bolus; Herrea gydouwensis L.Bolus; Herrea inaequalis L.Bolus; Herrea klaverensis L.Bolus; Herrea laticalyx L.Bolus; Herrea macrocalyx L.Bolus; Herrea obtusa L.Bolus; Herrea plana L.Bolus; Herrea porcina L.Bolus; Herrea robusta (N.E.Br.) L.Bolus; Herrea ronaldii L.Bolus; Herrea roodiae (N.E.Br.) L.Bolus; Herrea stipitata L.Bolus; Mesembryanthemum elongatum Haw.; Mesembryanthemum fusiforme Haw.

= Conicosia elongata =

Succulent endemic to the Cape Provinces

Conicosia elongata is a species of succulent plant in the genus Conicosia. It is endemic to the Northern Cape and Western Cape of South Africa.

== Conservation status ==
Conicosia elongata is classified as Least Concern.
