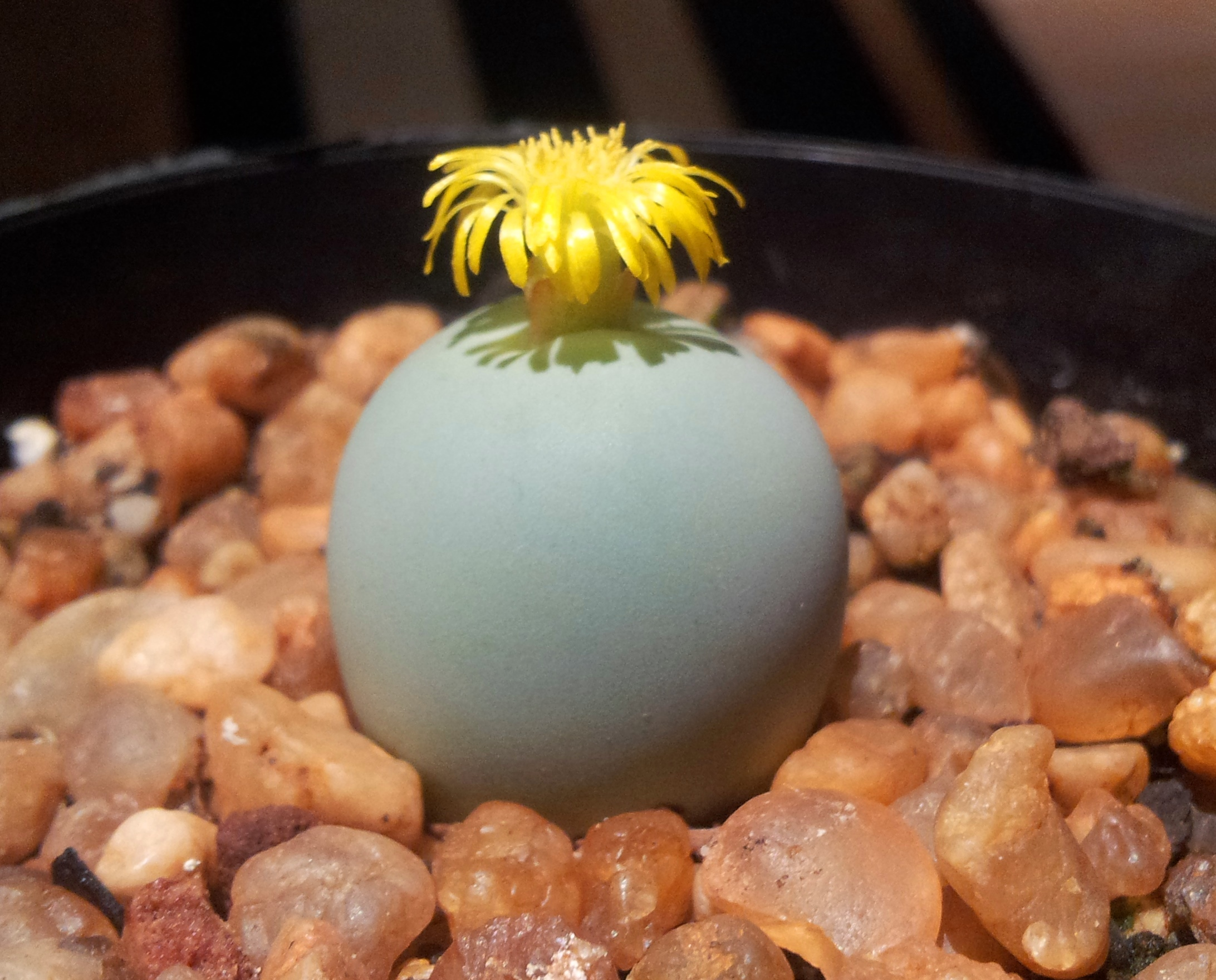
- Conophytum calculus subsp. calculus with its flower open at night

Conservation status
- Critically Endangered (IUCN 3.1)
- CITES Appendix III

Scientific classification
- Kingdom: Plantae
- Clade: Embryophytes
- Clade: Tracheophytes
- Clade: Spermatophytes
- Clade: Angiosperms
- Clade: Eudicots
- Order: Caryophyllales
- Family: Aizoaceae
- Genus: Conophytum
- Species: C. calculus

Binomial name
- Conophytum calculus (A.Berger) N.E.Br.

Synonyms
- Conophytum komkansicum L.Bolus; Mesembryanthemum calculus A.Berger

= Conophytum calculus =

Species of flowering plant

Conophytum calculus is a small South African species of succulent plant in the family Aizoaceae.

== Description ==
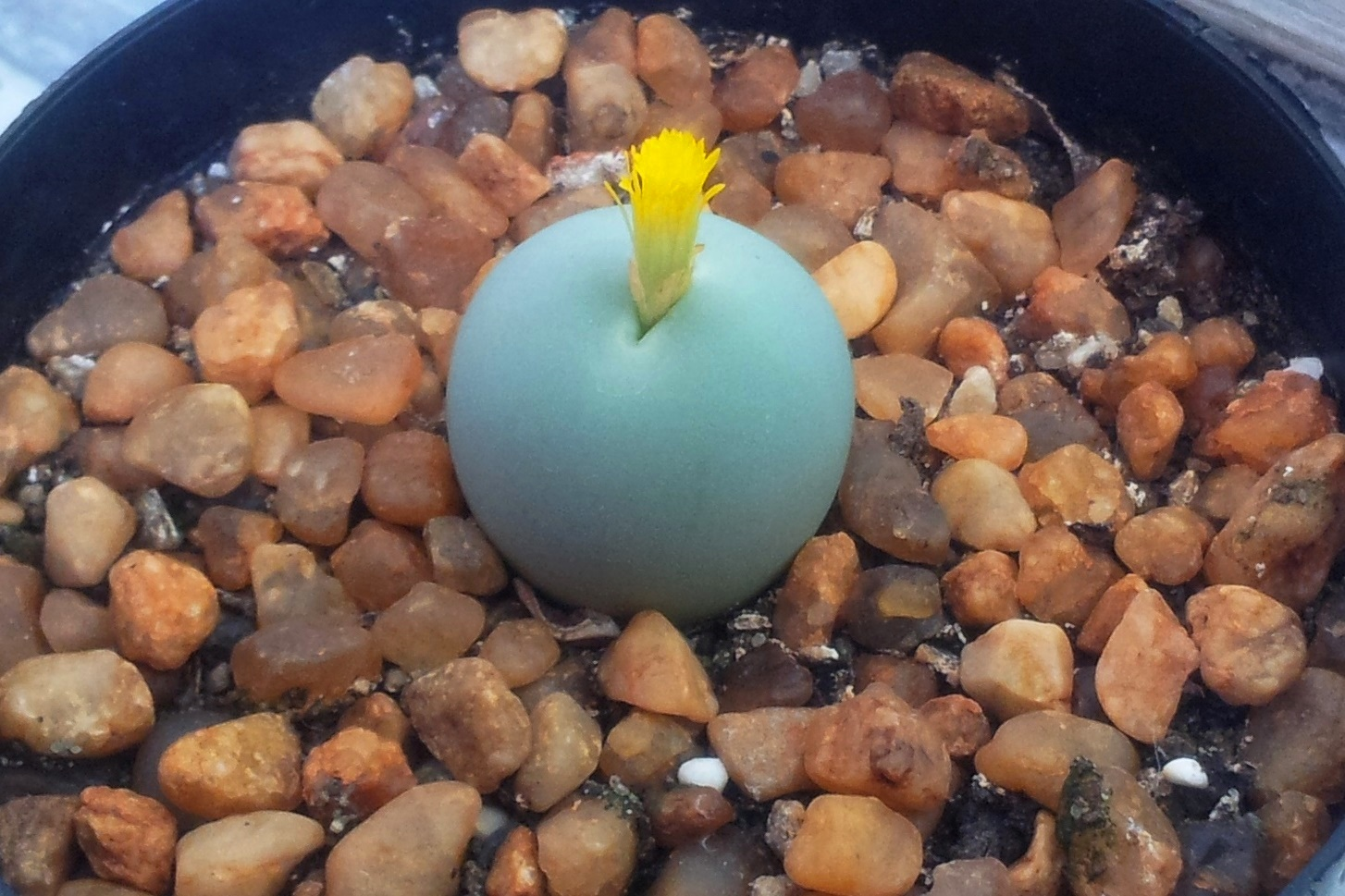
Small specimen of Conophytum calculus subsp. calculus in cultivation

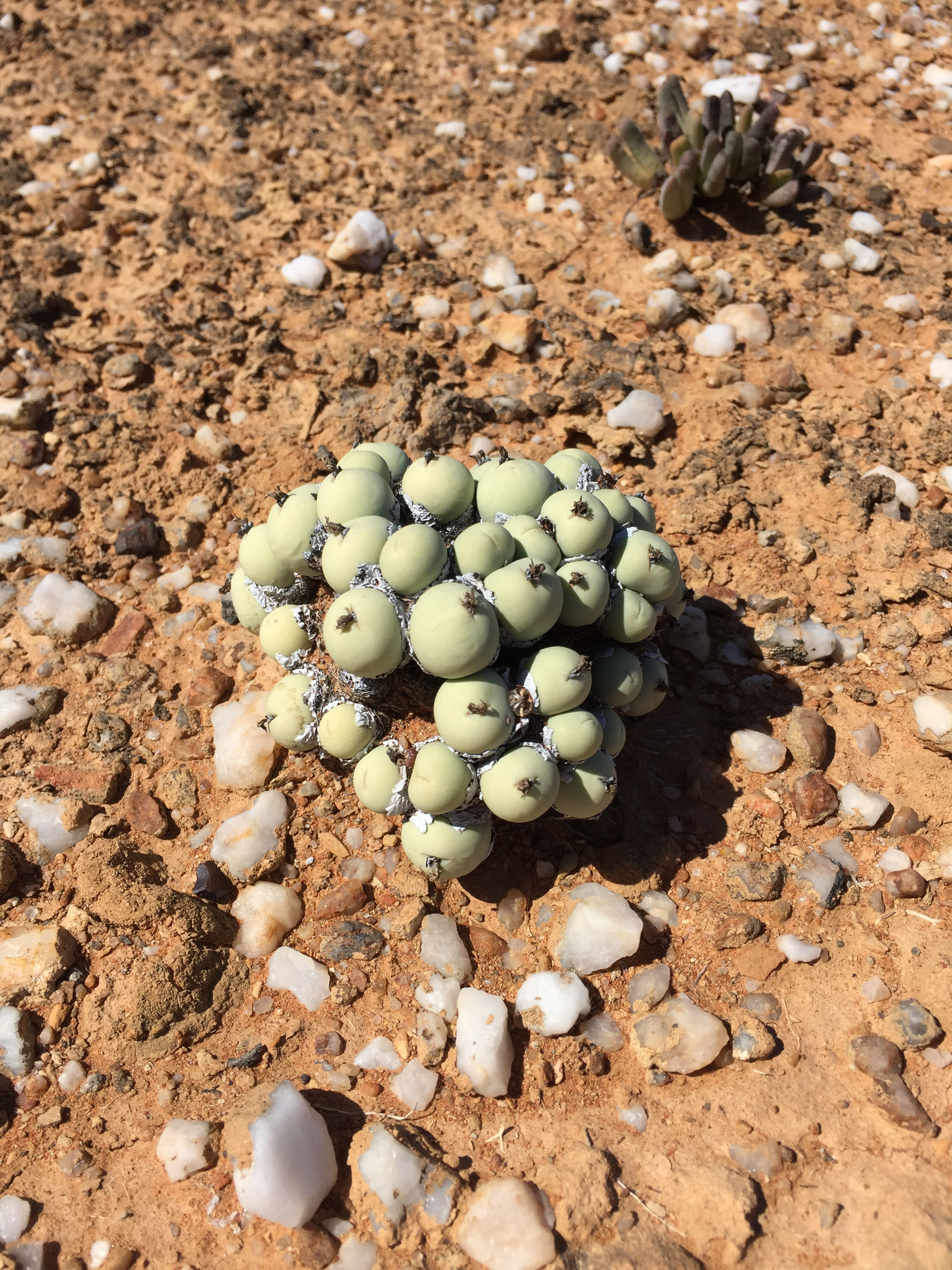
Clump of Conophytum calculus subsp. calculus in habitat

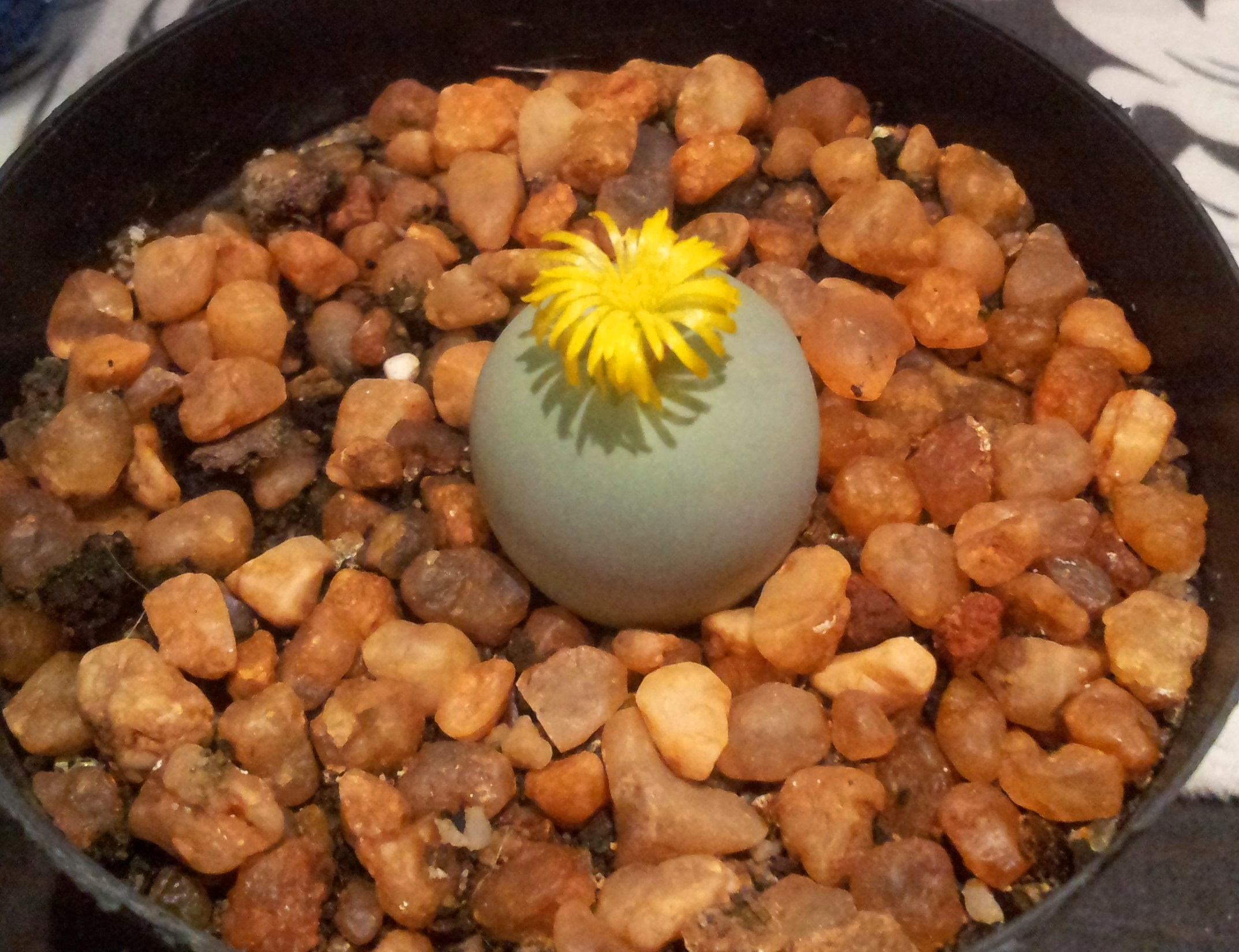
Flower detail, of Conophytum calculus subsp. calculus.

Rounded ball-shaped succulent plant, that divides to form dense clumps. The resemblance to pebbles and the firmness of its flesh is what got it its name ("calculus" is Latin for "pebble"). It produces yellow or orange flowers in autumn, that open at night, and have the aroma of cloves.

The ball shape is formed from the plant's leaf-pair having fused entirely, leaving only a tiny slit at the top, where the flower and the succeeding leaf pair pushes through. The new leaf-pair forms inside the ball. When it is ready, the ball of the old leaf-pair shrivels and dries out, before it is split open by the new leaf-pair ball. The epidermis (and therefore the dried leaf sheath too) is thick and strong.

The plants are extremely long-lived, and individuals have been kept in cultivation for over 50 years. They offset slowly, forming clumps.

=== Subspecies ===
- C. calculus subsp. calculus. The type subspecies has round uniformly grey-green heads, smooth sheaths, and offsets to form mounds.
- C. calculus subsp. vanzylii (Lavis) S.A.Hammer. This form has smaller, paler, less scented flowers, marked sheaths, a more variable colour, and a more depressed, flattish, globose shape.

== Distribution ==
Conophytums are all indigenous to the winter rainfall regions of southern Africa. Conophytum calculus subsp. calculus is restricted to the "Knersvlakte" region, in the far north-west of the Western Cape Province, South Africa. Here it is confined to the area between Bitterfontein and Holsrivier. The subspecies vanzylii occurs over 100 km to the north, in the western part of Bushmanland.

The "Knersvlakte" is a region of white, quartz pebble-fields. Therefore, in spite of the semi-arid climate and desiccating sun, the soil is typically quite cool (due to the reflective white of the quartz pebble-fields). The clove-scented flowers are pollinated by moths at night.

== Cultivation ==
This species is popular in cultivation. However it requires much bright light, very well-drained sand, and specific winter-watering conditions.

They thrive in pots, in a mildly-acidic, coarse, extremely well-drained, soil-sand mix. In winter they can be lightly watered (from spring right through to autumn) and given bright morning light with afternoon shade. In summer they go dormant, and should be kept mostly dry and can even be partially shaded.

The plant produces obvious wrinkles when it requires more water. It cracks and splits open when it receives too much water. It elongates and keeps multiple leaf pairs if it does not receive enough light.

They can be propagated by cuttings, subdivision of clumps, or by seed.
