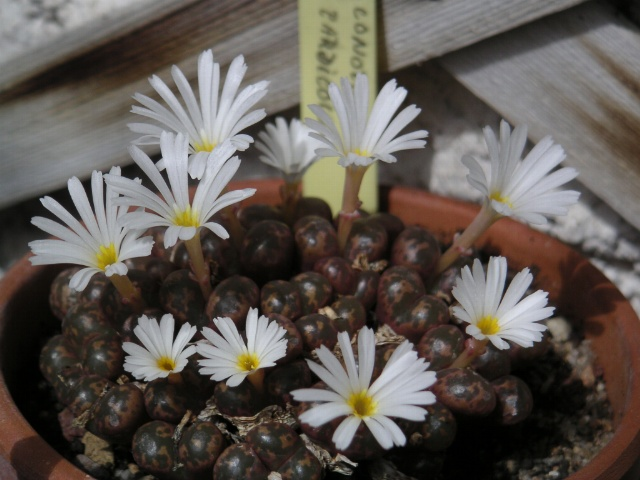
- In bloom

Conservation status
- Endangered (IUCN 3.1)
- CITES Appendix III

Scientific classification
- Kingdom: Plantae
- Clade: Tracheophytes
- Clade: Angiosperms
- Clade: Eudicots
- Order: Caryophyllales
- Family: Aizoaceae
- Genus: Conophytum
- Species: C. pellucidum

Binomial name
- Conophytum pellucidum Schwantes

Synonyms
- List: Conophytum areolatum Littlew.; Conophytum elegans N.E.Br.; Conophytum fenestratum Schwantes; Conophytum pardicolor Tischer; Conophytum pellucidum subsp. sterkstroomense G.F.Wagner; Conophytum terricolor Tischer; Lithops marlothii N.E.Br.; Ophthalmophyllum marlothii (N.E.Br.) Schwantes

= Conophytum pellucidum =

Species of flowering plant

Conophytum pellucidum, called the transparent cone plant, is a species of flowering plant in the genus Conophytum, native to the western Cape Provinces of South Africa. It has gained the Royal Horticultural Society's Award of Garden Merit.

== Subtaxa ==
The following subspecies and varieties are currently accepted:

- Conophytum pellucidum subsp. cupreatum (Tischer) S.A.Hammer
- Conophytum pellucidum var. lilianum (Littlew.) S.A.Hammer
- Conophytum pellucidum var. neohallii S.A.Hammer
- Conophytum pellucidum subsp. saueri S.A.Hammer & Smale
- Conophytum pellucidum var. terrestre (Tischer) S.A.Hammer
