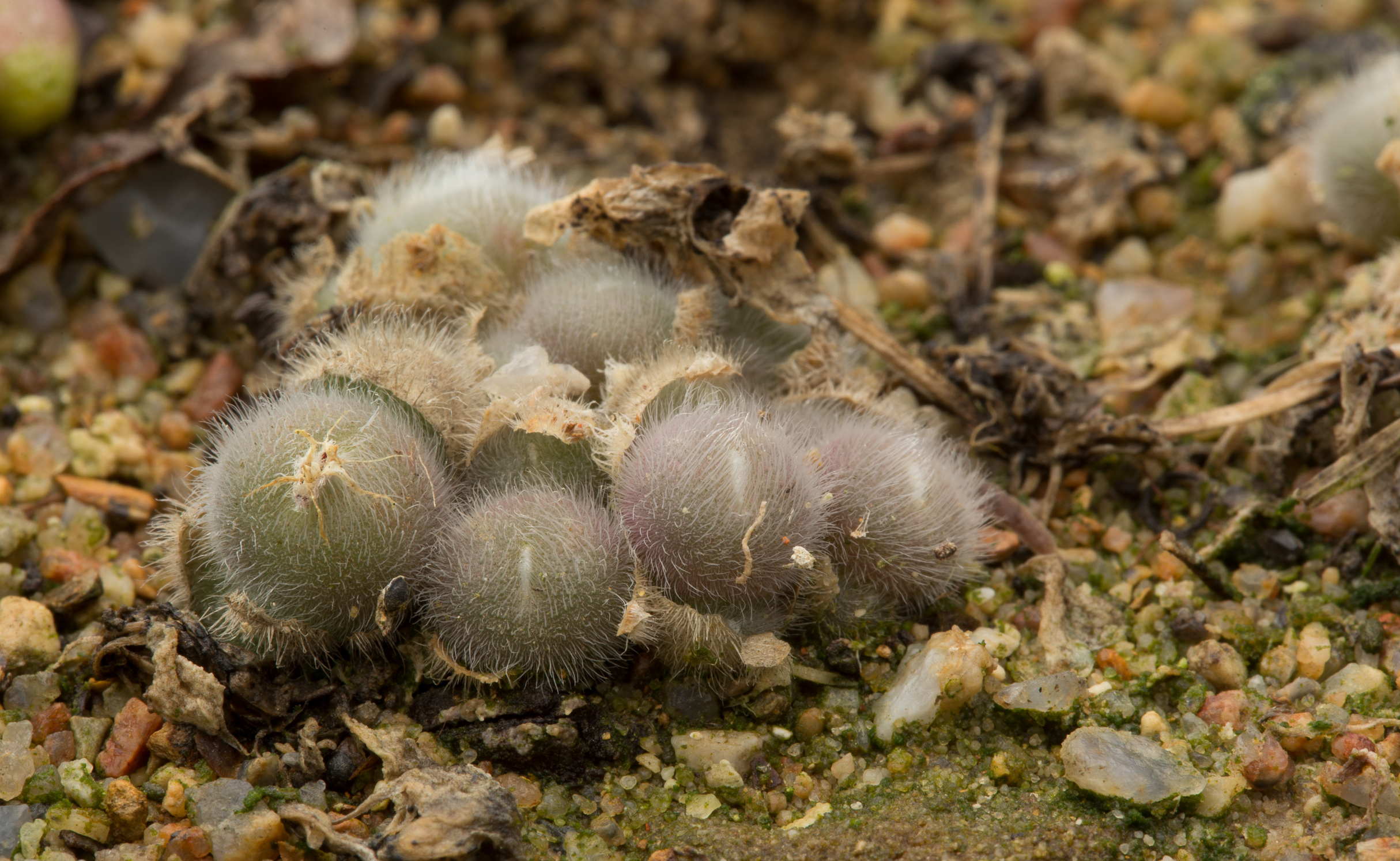

Conservation status
- Endangered (IUCN 3.1)
- CITES Appendix III

Scientific classification
- Kingdom: Plantae
- Clade: Embryophytes
- Clade: Tracheophytes
- Clade: Spermatophytes
- Clade: Angiosperms
- Clade: Eudicots
- Order: Caryophyllales
- Family: Aizoaceae
- Genus: Conophytum
- Species: C. stephanii

Binomial name
- Conophytum stephanii Schwantes

= Conophytum stephanii =

Species of succulent

Conophytum stephanii is a small South African species of Conophytum succulents named after German plant collector Paul Stephan, who tended the succulent collection at the Hamburg Botanic Garden in Hamburg, Germany. The plant was first described by Dr. Schwantes in 1929 and published in "Die Gartenwelt" 33:25.

== Description ==
Plants are small and mat forming, with clusters measuring between 50 and 80 millimetres (2.0 and 3.1 in) in diameter, though old plants may sometimes reach 150 millimetres (5.9 in). Bodies are obconical in shape, papillate, and greyish green to deep green in colour. Flowers appear in late autumn, and are nocturnal, strongly scented and off-white to yellow in color.

== Distribution ==
Conophytum stephanii grows in Namaqualand, South Africa, mainly between the towns of Steinkopf and Port Nolloth. Two subspecies are currently recognized: ssp. stephanii and ssp. helmutii.
