= Conophytum chrisolum =

Conservation status
- Critically Endangered (IUCN 3.1)
- CITES Appendix III

Scientific classification
- Kingdom: Plantae
- Clade: Embryophytes
- Clade: Tracheophytes
- Clade: Angiosperms
- Clade: Eudicots
- Order: Caryophyllales
- Family: Aizoaceae
- Genus: Conophytum
- Species: C. chrisolum

Binomial name
- Conophytum chrisolum S.A.Hammer

Species of succulent plant

Conophytum chrisolum is a species of succulent plant in the family Aizoaceae. It is endemic to the Richtersveld region of Northern Cape Province in South Africa. It may be the smallest free-living, land dwelling (non-aquatic) flowering plant, and certainly is the smallest succulent, measuring no more than 0.4 inch (10 mm) in height by less than 0.25 inch (6 mm) in width. It never branches or divides. It was only discovered in 1994 by botanical explorer Chris Rodgerson. The solitary magenta colored flower, up to 0.8 inch (20 mm) in diameter, is wider than the plant.
