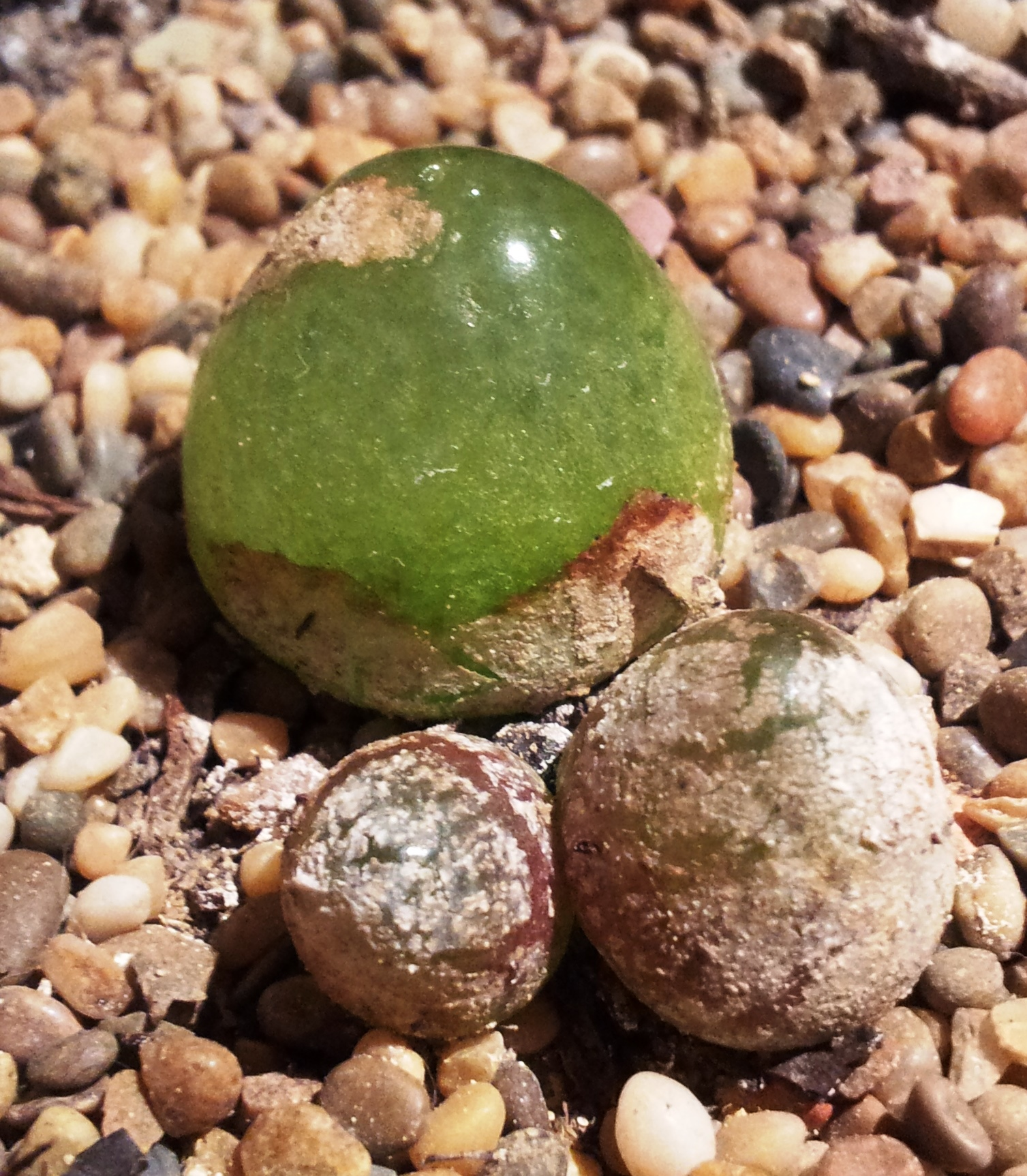
- Conophytum burgeri in cultivation

Conservation status
- Critically Endangered (IUCN 3.1)
- CITES Appendix III

Scientific classification
- Kingdom: Plantae
- Clade: Embryophytes
- Clade: Tracheophytes
- Clade: Spermatophytes
- Clade: Angiosperms
- Clade: Eudicots
- Order: Caryophyllales
- Family: Aizoaceae
- Genus: Conophytum
- Species: C. burgeri

Binomial name
- Conophytum burgeri L.Bolus

= Conophytum burgeri =

Species of succulent

Conophytum burgeri ("Burger's onion") is a small, endangered, South African species of succulent plant, of the genus Conophytum.

== Description ==
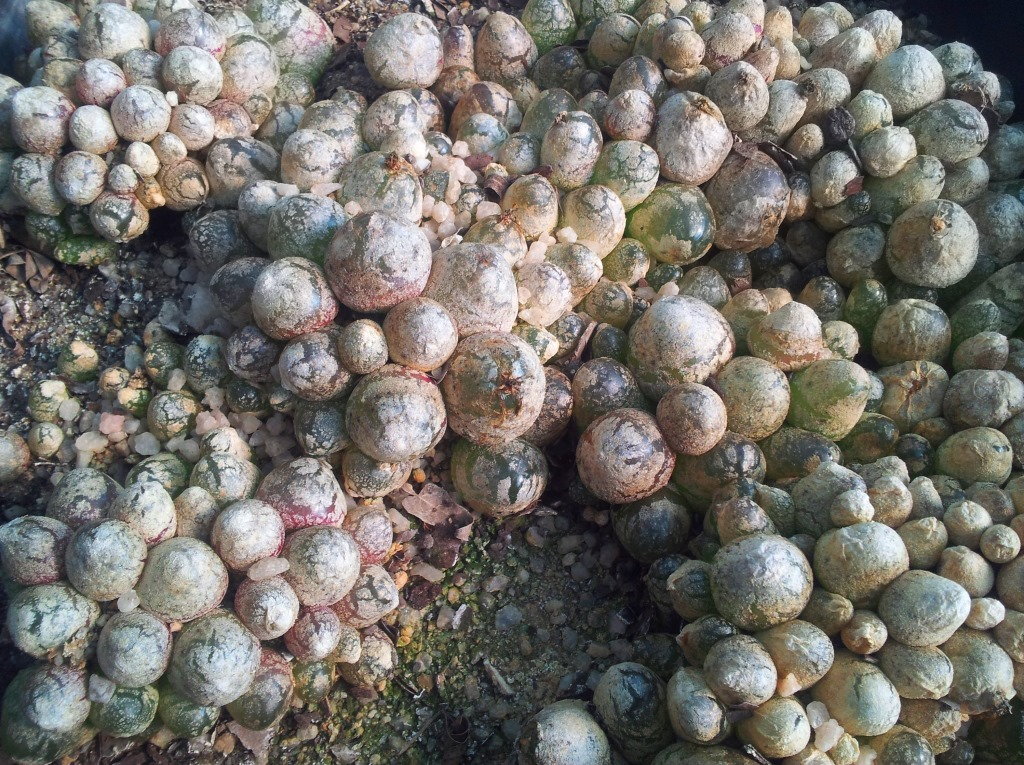
A dense bed of individual Conophytum burgeri plants, propagated from seed.

An onion-shaped, single-bodied, succulent plant, it is possibly the most unusual of all the species of the genus Conophytum. It has a tiny fissure at the top of its body. Its epidermis is smooth, shiny and translucent, and its colour is light green to purple. It is slow-growing and sometimes subdivides through a gradual process over several years, to form two or even three heads. It varies in size and can reach the size of a small onion.

Unlike most other Conophytums, it grows in a region of spring and early summer rainfall. However its habitat is extremely arid, and the plant may rely mainly on the copious winter fogs and dew that condenses on the rocks where it grows. When dormant, its outer covering dries into a thin, white, persistent leaf-sheath.

It produces a purple flower, in early autumn (April–May in South Africa), with the aroma of honey. The flowers open briefly in the late afternoon, has over 5 sepals and a long stigma (over 10 mm).

=== Relatives and distinguishing features ===
Some of its closest relatives such as Conophytum ratum, Conophytum achabense, Conophytum hammeri and Conophytum subterraneum do have a similar cone shape. Conophytum burgeri can be distinguished from these by its long stigma (over 10 mm) and by its epidermis becoming purple to red in direct sunlight. (Conophytum subterraneum, for example, has a stigma under 7 mm long, and remains a green colour). Conophytum ratum has a larger fissure (3–4 mm) that is embedded or sunken in the body. Conophytum achabense has only 4 sepals, and Conophytum hammeri has an obscure translucent window at its apex.

== Distribution ==
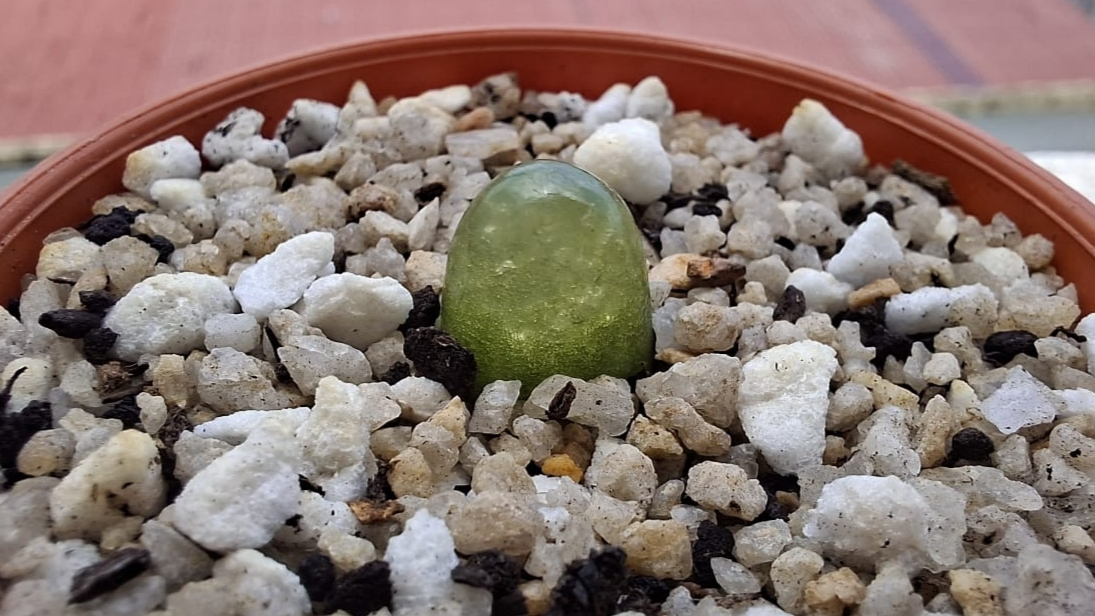
A young specimen of Conophytum burgeri germinated and grown from seed.

This species is endemic to Bushmanland in the Northern Cape Province, South Africa, where it is known from the mines of the Aggeneys valley (between Sprinbok and Pofadder).

Here it grows on high, open, raised, exposed flats, in rocky clay soil, which is strewn with white quartz pebbles that keep the soil relatively cool.

Aggeneys was the farm of the Burger family, and it was named after the farmer Willem Burger, who noticed the unusual plant and contacted the botanist H.C. Kennedy.

== Cultivation ==
=== Water ===
The desert habitat of this species receives its sparse rainfall mainly in spring and early summer, with very little rainfall in the winter. The plants may receive water from dew or condensation in the winter, because in cultivation Conophytum burgeri can be treated as a winter-rainfall species, like most other Conophytum species. All Conophytums have an annual growing period when they receive some water, and a dry dormancy period. In their dormancy they can be left dry and only given water if they visibly start to shrivel. Alternatively, Conophytum burgeri can be given water occasionally throughout the year, at intervals of a week or two. It shrivels when it needs more water; and it splits open when it receives too much. Seeds can be sown in early summer, and given light watering regularly for a year, before the seedlings begin their annual dormancy periods.

=== Sunlight and temperatures ===
They require direct and plentiful sunlight. It can be given slight shelter at the peak of the hottest summer days. They are grown best in hardiness zones 10b to 11b: from 35 °F (1.7 °C) to 50 °F (10 °C). A cooler temperature at night and good ventilation is also beneficial for the plants.

=== Soil and propagation ===
This plant requires a very pourous soil mix with a high amount of mineral composition. The plant can be propagated by seed and can also be propagated by subdivisions. The soil should be completely dry between light waterings.
