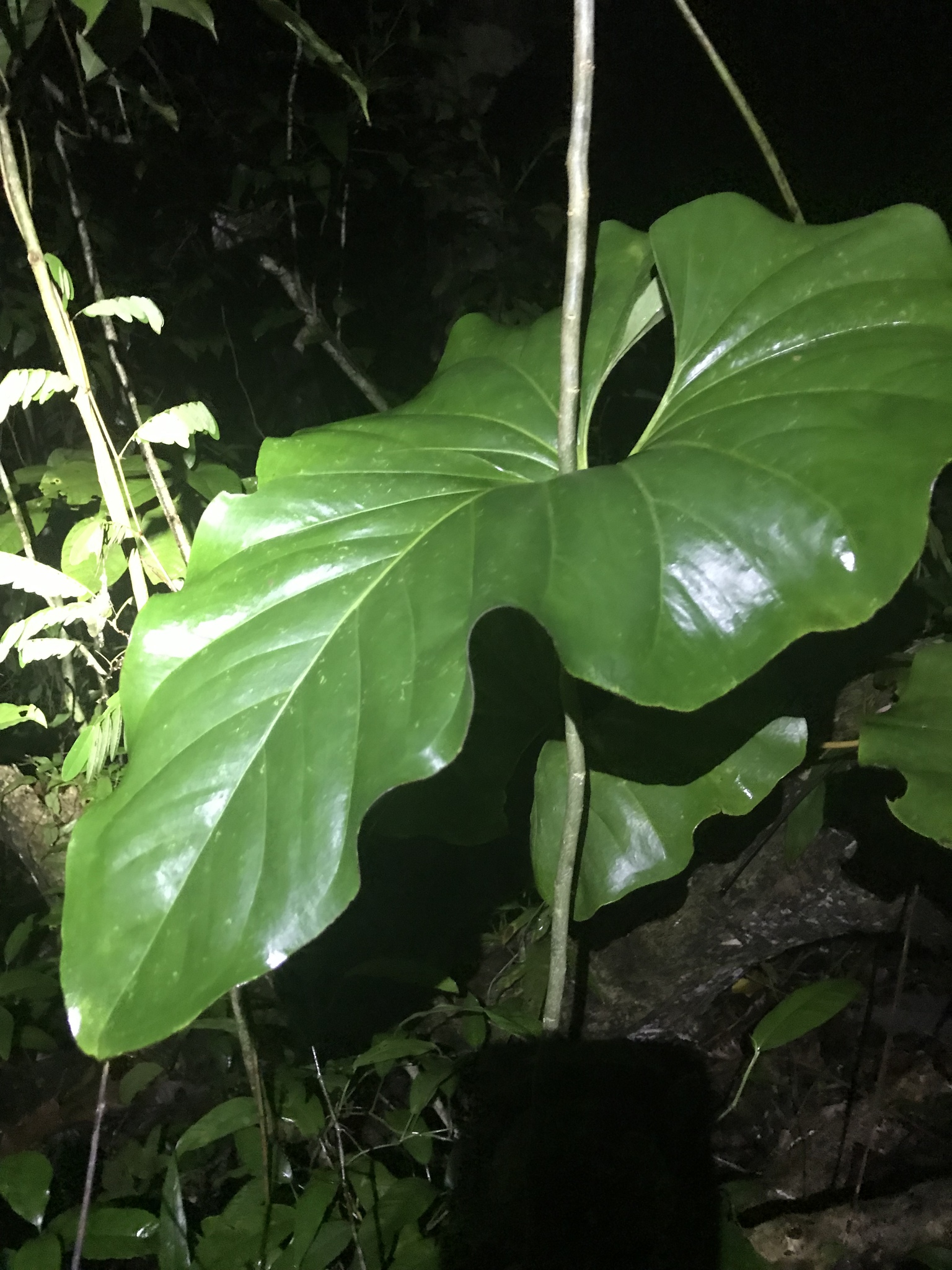
- Anthurium brownii in Panama

Scientific classification
- Kingdom: Plantae
- Clade: Tracheophytes
- Clade: Angiosperms
- Clade: Monocots
- Order: Alismatales
- Family: Araceae
- Genus: Anthurium
- Species: A. brownii

Binomial name
- Anthurium brownii Mast.

= Anthurium brownii =

Species of plant

Anthurium brownii is a species of flowering plant in the family Araceae. It is native to Central and South America, from Costa Rica through Panama, and south to Colombia, Ecuador, and Venezuela. First scientifically described in 1876, it was collected by Gustav Wallis and named for N. E. Brown. A. brownii grows from sea level up to 1,200 meters (3,900 ft) in tropical forests.
