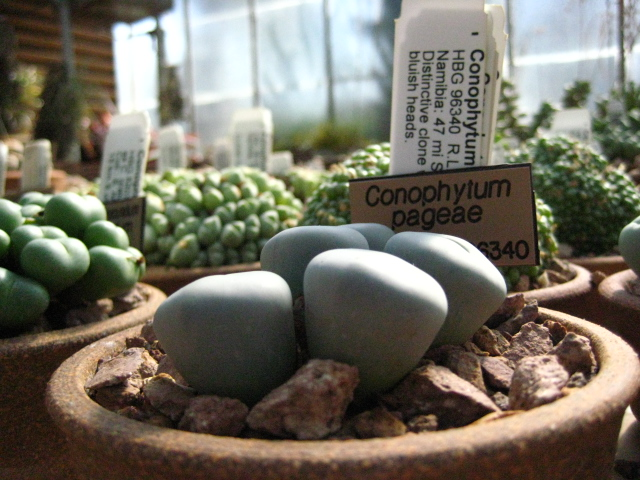

Conservation status
- Vulnerable (IUCN 3.1)

Scientific classification
- Kingdom: Plantae
- Clade: Tracheophytes
- Clade: Angiosperms
- Clade: Eudicots
- Order: Caryophyllales
- Family: Aizoaceae
- Genus: Conophytum
- Species: C. pageae

Binomial name
- Conophytum pageae N.E.Br.

= Conophytum pageae =

Species of flowering plant

Conophytum pageae is a species of succulent plant in the genus Conophytum, commonly called the “lips plant” or “button plant”.

It is native to South Africa as well as southern Namibia.

It is somewhat unusual due to its striking resemblance to human lips, which may be more visible in some specimens than in others.

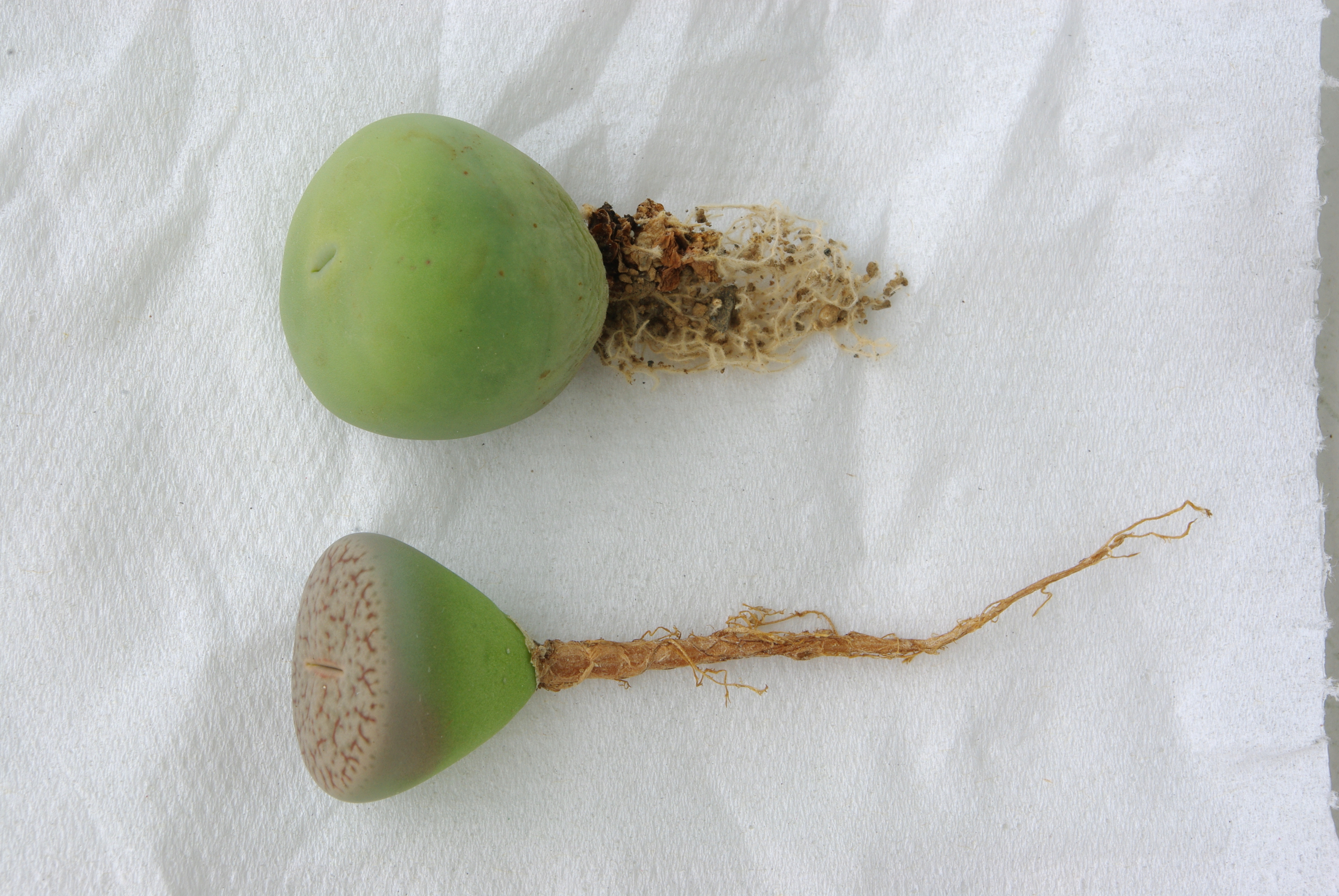
Conophytum pageae (top) and Lithops pseudotruncatella (bottom)
