= N. E. Brown =

English botanist (1849–1934)

Nicholas Edward Brown
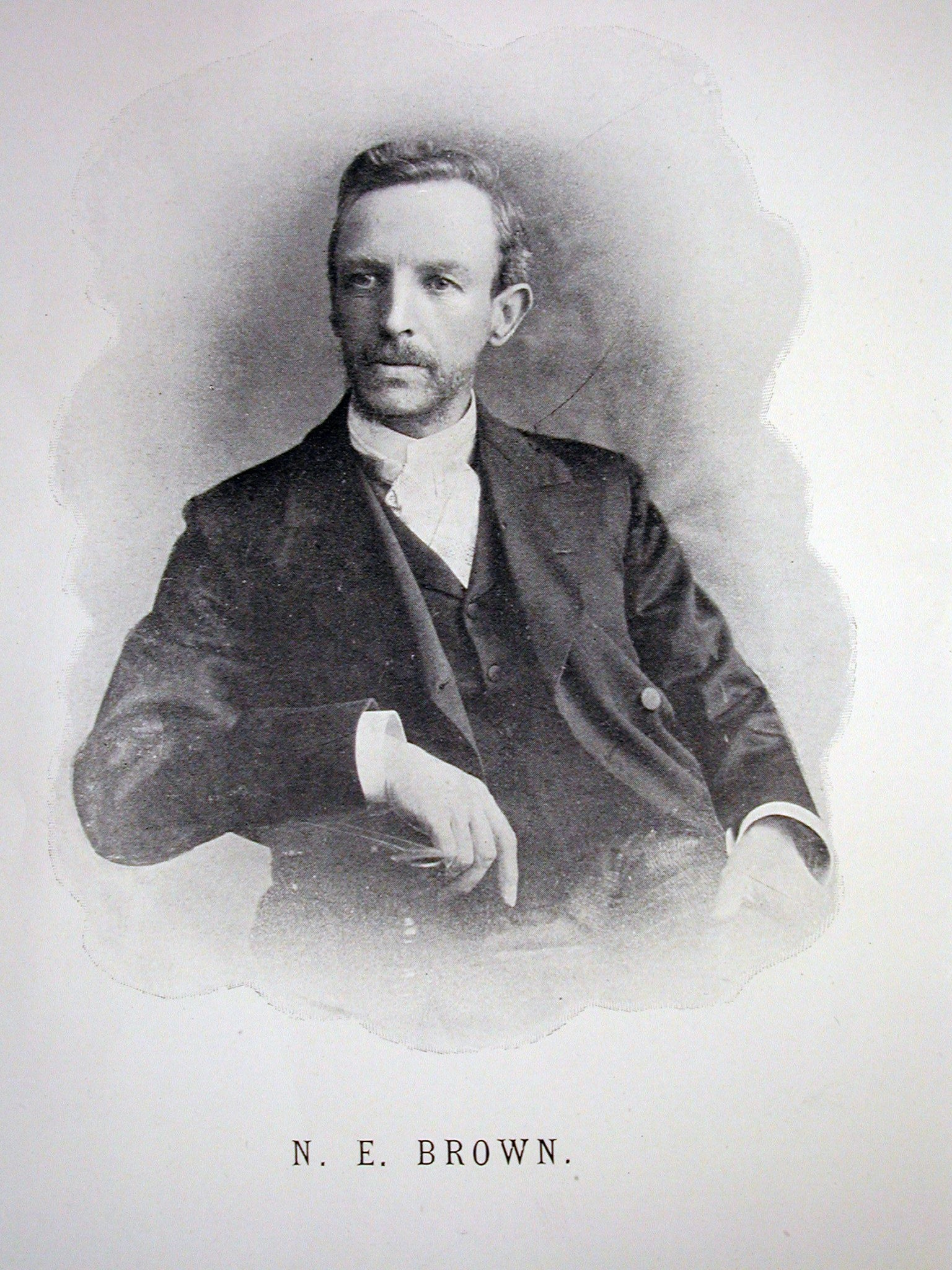
- Born: 11 July 1849; Redhill, Surrey, England
- Died: 25 November 1934 (aged 85); Kew Gardens, London, England
- Scientific career
- Fields: Botany
- Author abbrev. (botany): N.E.Br.

Nicholas Edward Brown (11 July 1849 in Redhill, Surrey – 25 November 1934 in Kew Gardens, London) was an English plant taxonomist and authority on succulents. He was also an authority on several families of plants, including Asclepiadaceae, Aizoaceae, Labiatae and Cape plants.

== Background ==
He started work as an assistant in the Herbarium at Kew in 1873, and was promoted to the position of Assistant Keeper in 1909, which he kept until 1914. He produced many annotated drawings of succulent plants in his work revising the genus Mesembryanthemum, which were published in 1931. He was the author of several works on the taxonomy of plants, particularly succulents. The Araceae genus Nebrownia was named in his honour by Otto Kuntze. A number of plants bear the specific name "nebrownii" – such as Acacia nebrownii, Gibbaeum nebrownii, Caralluma nebrownii and Lithops olivacea v nebrownii, as does a waterhole in the Etosha National Park. The plant Anthurium brownii and the genus Brownanthus (now a synonym of Mesembryanthemum) also bear his name.

He was awarded the Captain Scott Memorial Medal by the South African Biological Society in recognition of his work on SA flora, and in 1932 an honorary D.Sc. was conferred on him by the University of the Witwatersrand. His publications appeared mainly in the Kew Bull. and in Flora Capensis. He married the daughter of Thomas Cooper (1815–1913), another Kew botanist.
