= Aptenia =

Formerly accepted genus of succulents

Aptenia was a small genus of flowering plants in the family Aizoaceae, which as of January 2024 was treated as a synonym of the genus Mesembryanthemum. Species formerly placed in the genus are native to southern Africa. The genus name is from the Greek a- (not) and ptenos (winged), and refers to the wingless fruit capsules.

== Description ==
Species formerly placed in the genus are succulent subshrubs growing from a system of fibrous, often fleshy roots. The stems lie prostrate on the ground or may climb. The stem bases are woody, and the stems are green. The leaves are mostly oppositely arranged, but those near the inflorescences may be alternate. The leaf blades are flat, hairless, sometimes waxy, and usually heart-shaped, or occasionally lance-shaped. Flowers are solitary or grow in small, whorled clusters, usually in the leaf axils along the stem. The flower is about a centimeter wide. There are two large sepals and two smaller. The corolla contains many narrow petals in shades of pink, purple, yellow, or white, and several staminodes that look very much like the petals. The many fertile stamens at the center are white or yellow. The fruit is a capsule with four valves.

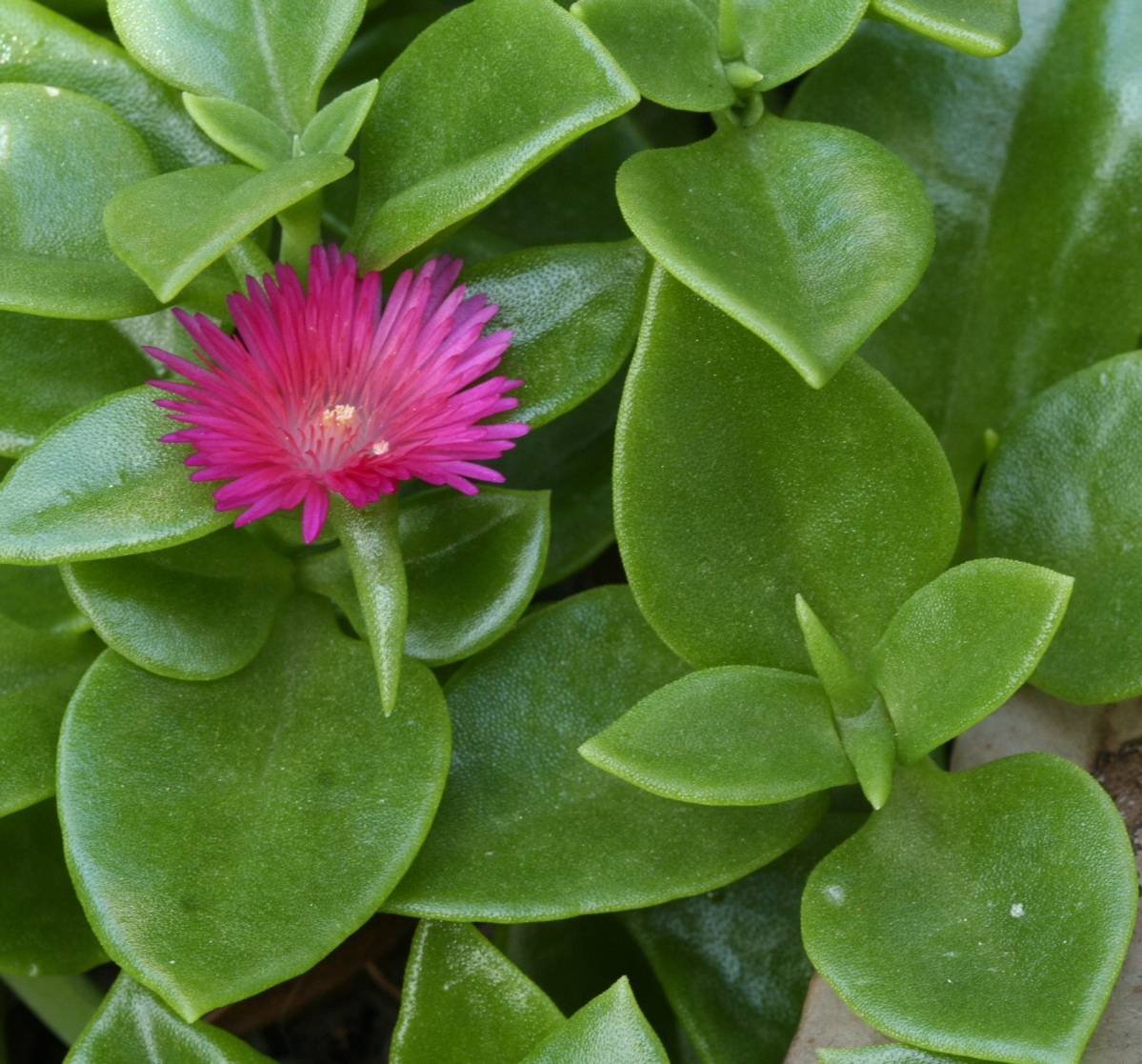
Flower and leaves of Mesembryanthemum cordifolium, formerly Aptenia cordifolia

== Taxonomy ==
In 2007, this genus and several others were transferred into Mesembryanthemum. Two years later other authors proposed that this move be reversed. As of January 2024, Plants of the World Online continued to synonymize it with Mesembryanthemum.

=== Species ===
Four species have been recognized:

- Aptenia cordifolia (L.f.) Schwantes → Mesembryanthemum cordifolium – heart-leaf iceplant, baby sun-rose
- Aptenia geniculiflora (L.) Bittrich ex Gerbaulet → Mesembryanthemum geniculiflorum
- Aptenia haeckeliana (A.Berger) Bittrich ex Gerbaulet → Mesembryanthemum haeckelianum
- Aptenia lancifolia L.Bolus → Mesembryanthemum lancifolium
