= MCT =

MCT may refer to:

== Astronomy ==
- A Maksutov–Cassegrain telescope
- Morning Civil Twilight, from when the center of the Sun is less than 6° below the horizon to sunrise.

== Biochemistry ==
- Medium-chain triglycerides, a class of fat with specific dietary and technical properties (also MCT oil)
- Monocarboxylate transporters, a family of proton-linked plasma membrane transporters that carry molecules having one carboxylate group (monocarboxylates), such as lactate and pyruvate, across biological membranes.
- Methyl halide transferase, an enzyme

== Companies ==
- Marine Current Turbines
- McClatchy-Tribune Information Services, the news service formerly known as Knight Ridder Tribune
- Media Capital Technologies

== Computing ==
- Microsoft Certified Trainer
- Mobile Computer Terminal
- Multi Core Timer in Exynos (system on chip) processors

== Engineering ==
- Maximum continuous thrust, an aviation abbreviation for a jet engine rating
- Mercury cadmium telluride (HgCdTe), a semiconductor with a particularly narrow bandgap used in mid- and far-infrared detectors (e.g. night vision)
- MOS-controlled thyristor, a type of thyristor (a solid-state semiconductor device)
- Multi Cable Transits, A fire-stop is a fire protection system made of various components used to seal openings and joints in fire-resistance rated wall and/or floor assemblies. For penetrating cables, these can also be called as Multi Cable Transits (MCTs).

== Medicine ==
- Mast cell tumor
- Methacholine challenge test, a medical test to assess the degree of a bronchial hyperresponsiveness (e.g. in asthma).
- Munich Chronotype Questionnaire (MCTQ), a standardized test for evaluating patient sleep/wake patterns
- Ketogenic diet (MCT diet)
- Micro Computed Tomography

== Psychology ==
- Metacognitive therapy

== Transportation ==
- Mars Colonial Transporter, a proposed interplanetary transportation system by SpaceX
- Madison County Transit, a public transportation service in Madison County, Illinois
- Muscat International Airport, the airport serving Muscat, Oman (IATA code is MCT)

== Other ==
- Minnesota Chippewa Tribe
- Mengisa language (ISO 639 code: mct)
- Marine Combat Training, a training course at the United States Marine Corps School of Infantry
- Monotone convergence theorem, in mathematics
- Motivation crowding theory, in economics
- Member of the Association of Corporate Treasurers, a professional organization
- Miss Chinese Toronto Pageant, the annual Toronto beauty pageant for Chinese Canadians
- Multichannel television
- Mutable collagenous tissue

== See also ==
- MCTS (disambiguation)
