= Chloromethane =

Chemical compound formerly used as a refrigerant

- Stereo, skeletal formula of chloromethane with all explicit hydrogens added

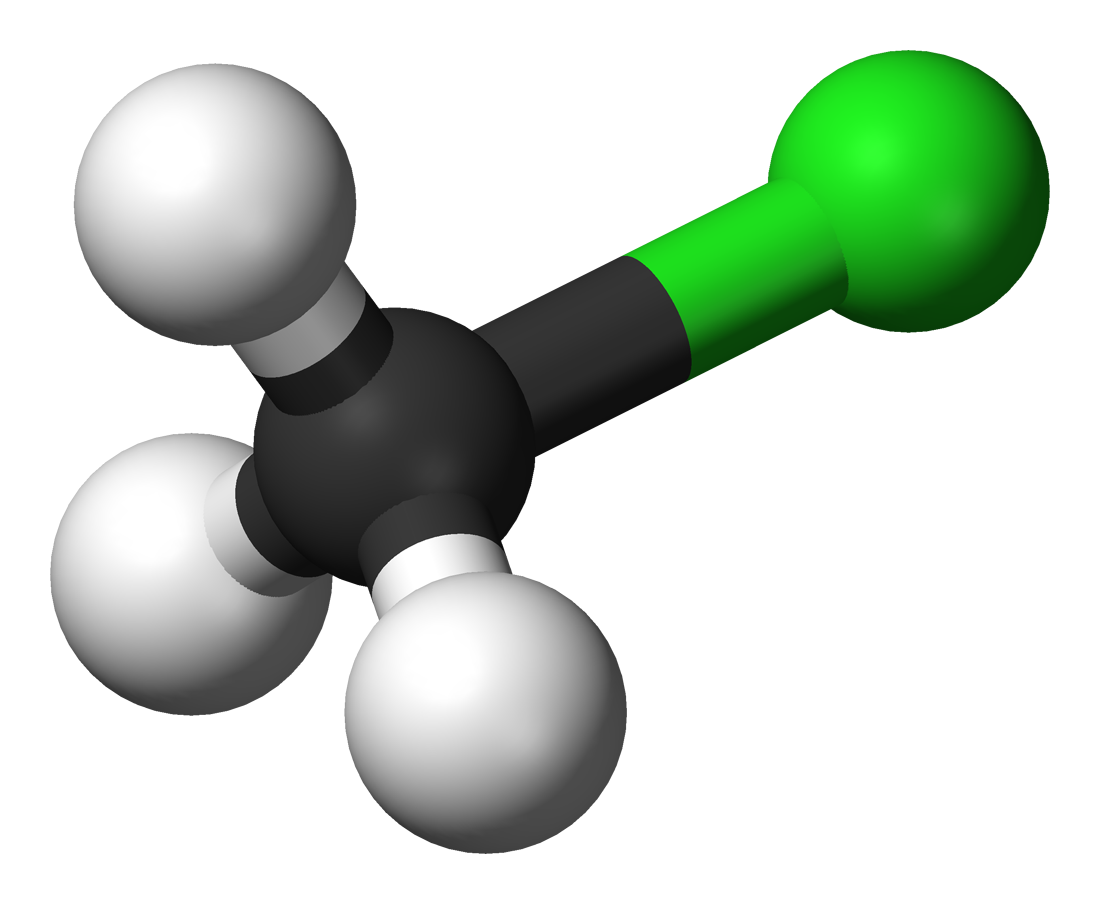
Ball and stick model of chloromethane
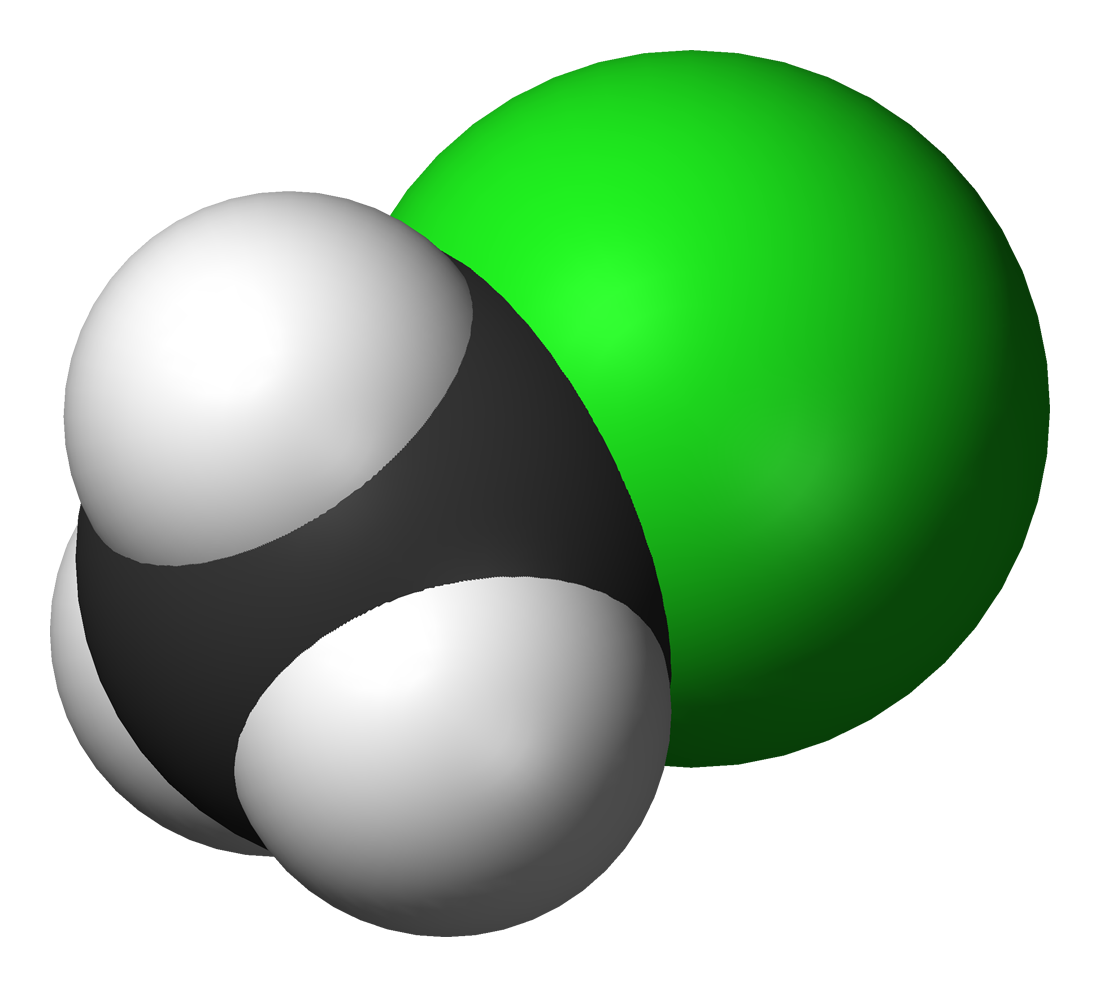
Spacefill model of chloromethane

Names
- Preferred IUPAC name Chloromethane
- Other names: Refrigerant-40; R-40; Methyl chloride; Monochloromethane

Identifiers
CAS Number	74-87-3
3D model (JSmol)	Interactive image
Abbreviations	MeCl
Beilstein Reference	1696839
ChEBI	CHEBI:36014
ChEMBL	ChEMBL117545
ChemSpider	6087
ECHA InfoCard	100.000.744
EC Number	200-817-4
Gmelin Reference	24898
KEGG	C19446
MeSH	Methyl+Chloride
PubChem CID	6327
RTECS number	PA6300000
UNII	A6R43525YO
UN number	1063
CompTox Dashboard (EPA)	DTXSID0021541
- InChI: InChI=1S/CH3Cl/c1-2/h1H3 Key: NEHMKBQYUWJMIP-UHFFFAOYSA-N
- SMILES: CCl

Properties
Chemical formula	CH_{3}Cl
Molar mass	50.49 g·mol^{−1}
Appearance	Colorless gas
Odor	Faint, sweet odor
Density	1.003 g/mL (-23.8 °C, liquid) 2.3065 g/L (0 °C, gas)
Melting point	−97.4 °C (−143.3 °F; 175.8 K)
Boiling point	−23.8 °C (−10.8 °F; 249.3 K)
Solubility in water	5.325 g/L
log P	1.113
Vapor pressure	506.09 kPa (at 20 °C (68 °F))
Henry's law constant (k_{H})	940 nmol/(Pa⋅kg)
Magnetic susceptibility (χ)	−32.0·10^{−6} cm^{3}/mol

Structure
Coordination geometry	Tetragonal
Molecular shape	Tetrahedron
Dipole moment	1.9 D

Thermochemistry
Std molar entropy (S^{⦵}_{298})	234.36 J/(K⋅mol)
Std enthalpy of formation (Δ_{f}H^{⦵}_{298})	−83.68 kJ/mol
Std enthalpy of combustion (Δ_{c}H^{⦵}_{298})	−764.5–−763.5 kJ/mol

Hazards
- GHS labelling
Pictograms	(GHS02: Flammable) (GHS08: Health hazard)
Signal word	Danger
Hazard statements	H221, H280, H351, H361fd, H373, H420
Precautionary statements	P210, P260, P308+P313, P410+P403, P502
NFPA 704 (fire diamond)	2 4 0
Flash point	−20 °C (−4 °F; 253 K)
Autoignition temperature	625 °C (1,157 °F; 898 K)
Explosive limits	8.1–17.4%
- Lethal dose or concentration (LD, LC)
LD_{50} (median dose)	150–180 mg/kg (oral, rat); 5.3 mg/L (4 h, inhalation, rat)
LC_{50} (median concentration)	72,000 ppm (rat, 30 min); 2200 ppm (mouse, 6 h); 2760 ppm (mammal, 4 h); 2524 ppm (rat, 4 h)
LC_{Lo} (lowest published)	20,000 ppm (guinea pig, 2 h); 14,661 ppm (dog, 6 h)
- NIOSH (US health exposure limits)
PEL (Permissible)	TWA 100 ppm C 200 ppm 300 ppm (5-minute maximum peak in any 3 hours)
REL (Recommended)	Ca
IDLH (Immediate danger)	Ca [2000 ppm]

Related compounds
Related alkanes	Chloroiodomethane; Bromochloromethane; Dibromochloromethane
Related compounds	2-Chloroethanol

Supplementary data page
- Chloromethane (data page)
- Except where otherwise noted, data are given for materials in their standard state (at 25 °C [77 °F], 100 kPa). verify (what is ?) Infobox references

Chloromethane, also called methyl chloride, Refrigerant-40, R-40 or HCC 40, is an organic compound with the chemical formula CH_{3}Cl. One of the monohalomethanes, it is a colorless, sweet-smelling, flammable gas. Methyl chloride is a crucial reagent in industrial chemistry, although it is rarely present in consumer products, and was formerly utilized as a refrigerant. Most chloromethane is biogenic.

== Occurrence ==
Chloromethane is an abundant organohalogen, anthropogenic or natural, in the atmosphere. Natural sources produce an estimated 4,100,000,000 kg/yr.

=== Marine ===
Laboratory cultures of marine phytoplankton (Phaeodactylum tricornutum, Phaeocystis sp., Thalassiosira weissflogii, Chaetoceros calcitrans, Isochrysis sp., Porphyridium sp., Synechococcus sp., Tetraselmis sp., Prorocentrum sp., and Emiliana huxleyi) produce CH_{3}Cl, but in relatively insignificant amounts. An extensive study of 30 species of polar macroalgae revealed the release of significant amounts of CH_{3}Cl in only Gigartina skottsbergii and Gymnogongrus antarcticus.

=== Biogenesis ===
The salt marsh plant Batis maritima contains the enzyme methyl chloride transferase that catalyzes the synthesis of CH_{3}Cl from S-adenosine-L-methionine and chloride. This protein has been purified and expressed in E. coli, and seems to be present in other organisms such as white rot fungi (Phellinus pomaceus), red algae (Endocladia muricata), and the ice plant (Mesembryanthemum crystallinum), each of which is a known CH_{3}Cl producer.

=== Sugarcane and the emission of methyl chloride ===
In the sugarcane industry, the organic waste is usually burned in the power cogeneration process. When contaminated by chloride, this waste burns, releasing methyl chloride in the atmosphere.

=== Interstellar detections ===
Chloromethane has been detected in the low-mass Class 0 protostellar binary, IRAS 16293–2422, using the Atacama Large Millimeter Array (ALMA). It was also detected in the comet 67P/Churyumov–Gerasimenko (67P/C-G) using the Rosetta Orbiter Spectrometer for Ion and Neutral Analysis (ROSINA) instrument on the Rosetta spacecraft. The detections reveal that chloromethane can be formed in star-forming regions before planets or life is formed.

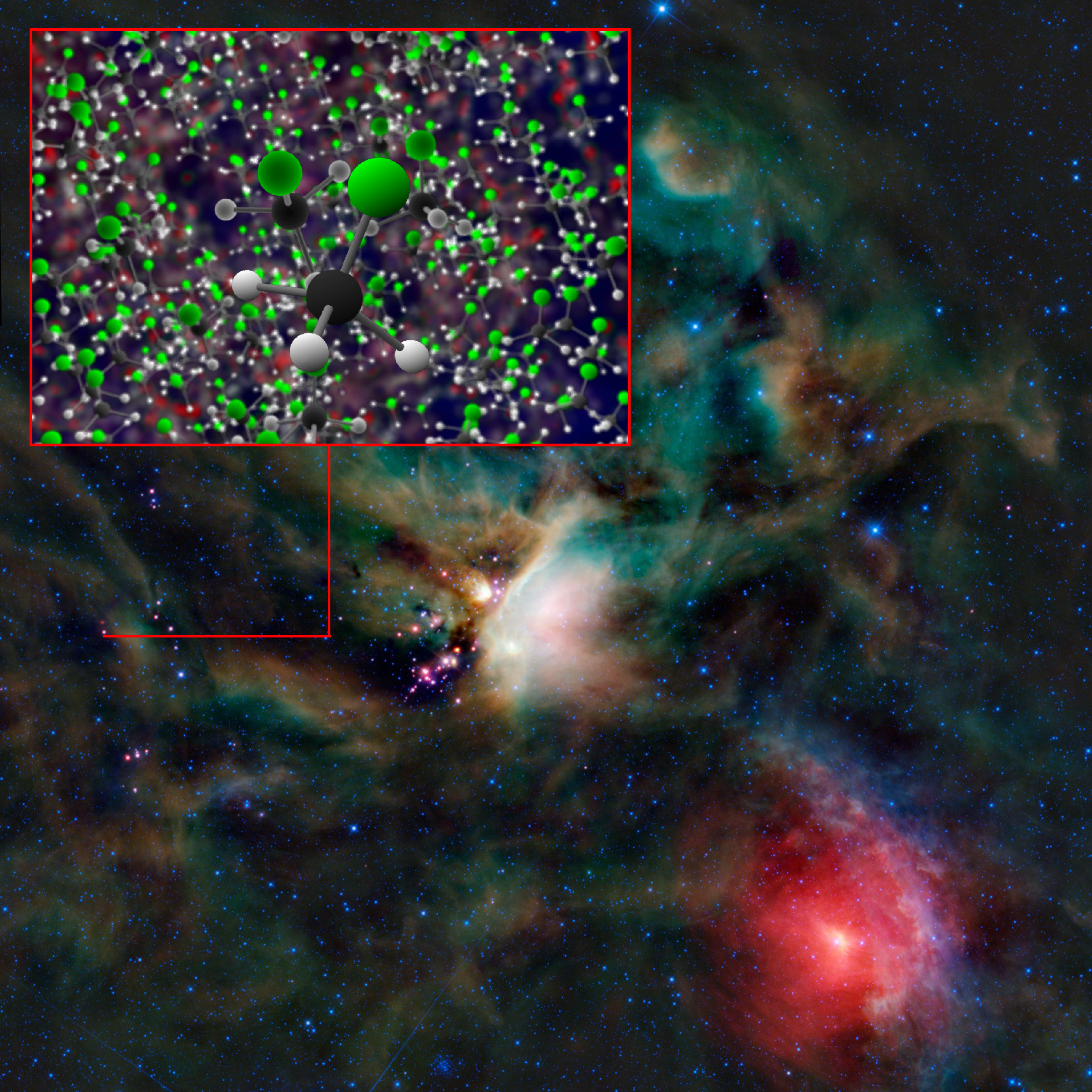
Chloromethane has been detected in space.

== Production ==
Chloromethane (originally called "chlorohydrate of methylene") was among the earliest organochlorine compounds to be discovered when it was synthesized by French chemists Jean-Baptiste Dumas and Eugène-Melchior Péligot in 1835 by boiling a mixture of methanol, sulfuric acid, and sodium chloride. This method is the forerunner for that used today, which uses hydrogen chloride instead of sulfuric acid and sodium chloride.

Chloromethane is produced commercially by treating methanol with hydrochloric acid or hydrogen chloride, according to the chemical equation:

CH_{3}OH + HCl → CH_{3}Cl + H_{2}O

A smaller amount of chloromethane is produced by treating a mixture of methane with chlorine at elevated temperatures. This method, however, also produces more highly chlorinated compounds such as dichloromethane, chloroform, and carbon tetrachloride. For this reason, methane chlorination is usually only practiced when these other products are also desired. This chlorination method also cogenerates hydrogen chloride, which poses a disposal problem.

CH_{4} + Cl_{2} → CH_{3}Cl + HCl
CH_{3}Cl + Cl_{2} → CH_{2}Cl_{2} + HCl
CH_{2}Cl_{2} + Cl_{2} → CHCl_{3} + HCl
CHCl_{3} + Cl_{2} → CCl_{4} + HCl

== Dispersion in the environment ==
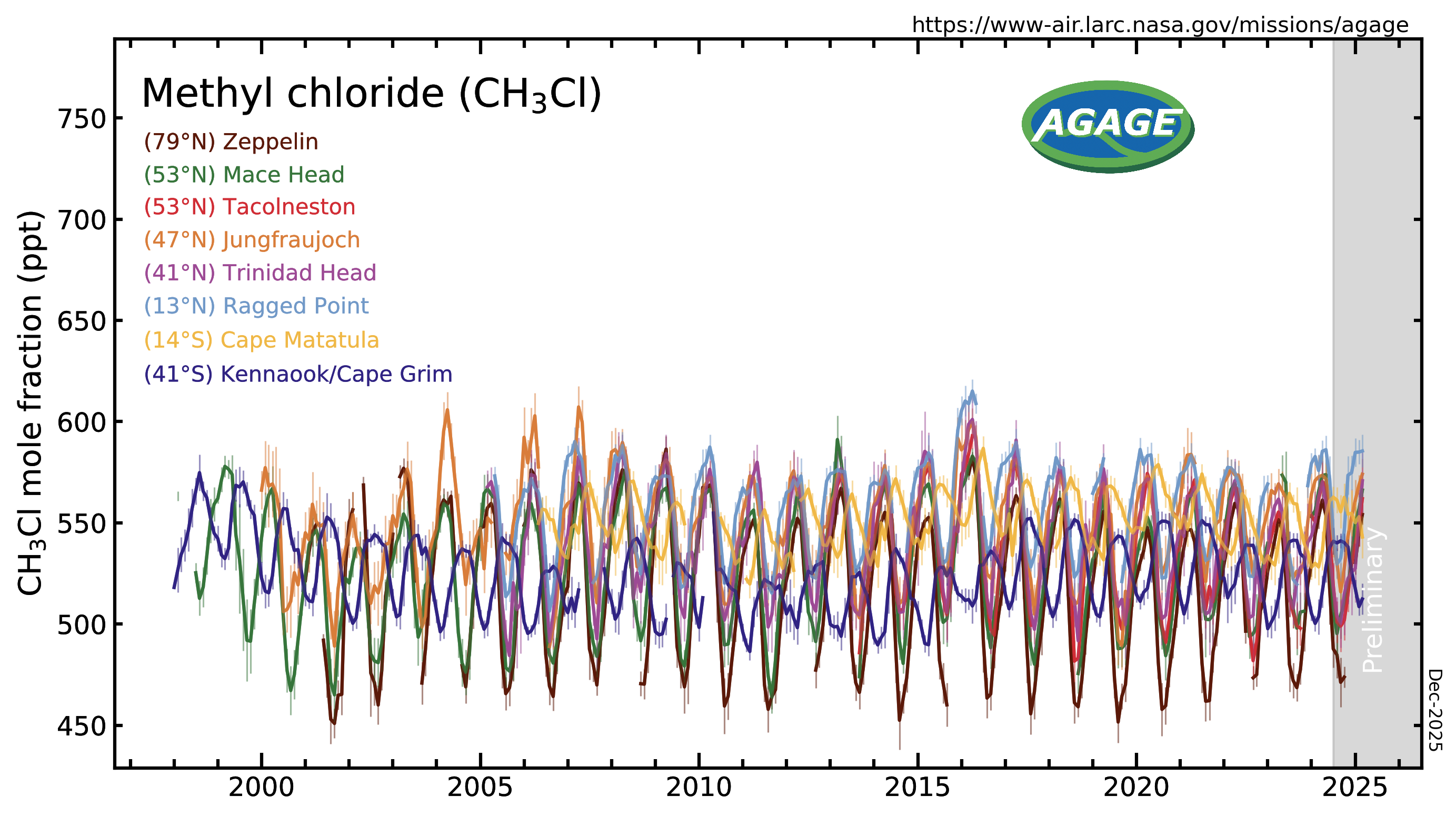
CH_{3}Cl measured by the Advanced Global Atmospheric Gases Experiment (AGAGE) in the lower atmosphere (troposphere) at stations around the world. Abundances are given as pollution free monthly mean mole fractions in parts per trillion.

Most of the methyl chloride present in the environment ends up being released to the atmosphere. After being released into the air, the atmospheric lifetime of this substance is about 10 months with multiple natural sinks, such as ocean, transport to the stratosphere, soil, etc.

On the other hand, when the methyl chloride emitted is released to water, it will be rapidly lost by volatilization. The half-life of this substance in terms of volatilization in the river, lagoon and lake is 2.1 h, 25 h and 18 days, respectively.

The amount of methyl chloride in the stratosphere is estimated to be 2×10^{6} tonnes per year, representing 20–25% of the total amount of chlorine that is emitted to the stratosphere annually.

== Uses ==
Large scale use of chloromethane is for the production of dimethyldichlorosilane and related organosilicon compounds. These compounds arise via the direct process. The relevant reactions are (Me = CH_{3}):

x MeCl + Si → Me_{3}SiCl, Me_{2}SiCl_{2}, MeSiCl_{3}, Me_{4}Si_{2}Cl_{2}, ...

Dimethyldichlorosilane (Me_{2}SiCl_{2}) is of particular value as a precursor to silicones, but trimethylsilyl chloride (Me_{3}SiCl) and methyltrichlorosilane (MeSiCl_{3}) are also valuable. Smaller quantities are used as a solvent in the manufacture of butyl rubber and in petroleum refining.

Chloromethane is employed as a methylating and chlorinating agent, e.g. the production of methylcellulose. It is also used in a variety of other fields: as an extractant for greases, oils, and resins, as a propellant and blowing agent in polystyrene foam production, as a local anesthetic, as an intermediate in drug manufacturing, as a catalyst carrier in low-temperature polymerization, as a fluid for thermometric and thermostatic equipment, and as a herbicide.

=== Obsolete applications ===
Chloromethane was widely used as a refrigerant during the 1920s and 1930s, before being replaced by safer alternatives such as chlorofluorocarbons and hydrofluorocarbons. In the late 1920s, some manufacturers promoted chloromethane as a safer and less odorous option compared to sulfur dioxide and ammonia. However, a series of fatal leaks in 1928 and 1929 raised serious concerns related to its toxicity and flammability. Although chloromethane has a faint sweet odor, its subtle scent made leaks difficult to detect. To address this issue, acrolein was later added as a nasal-irritating tracer, enhancing leak detection and serving as a warning mechanism.

Chloromethane was also once used for producing the lead-based gasoline additives tetramethyllead and tetraethyllead.

During the late 1880s, chloromethane began to be employed in a limited extent for its anesthetic properties, serving as both a general and local agent. Its use extended into the late 1920s as a component of the inhalation anesthetic Somnoform.

== Toxicity ==
Following inhalation, chloromethane is rapidly absorbed into the bloodstream and distributed throughout the body's tissues. It is primarily metabolized through conjugation with glutathione by the GST enzyme. This process depletes cellular glutathione levels and transforms the chloromethane into toxic intermediates, including formaldehyde and formate. These products are eventually integrated into the "one-carbon pool" for biosynthesis or exhaled as carbon dioxide. A secondary, less dominant metabolic pathway involves oxidation by cytochrome P450.

Methyl chloride is considered to act as a significant central nervous system (CNS) depressant. Acute inhalation produces effects similar to alcohol intoxication, including respiratory depression, dizziness, blurred vision, lack of coordination, and slurred speech; severe cases can progress to convulsions, coma, and death. Occupational safety standards have established a threshold limit value (TLV) and a maximum allowable concentration (MAC) of 50 ppm as a time-weighted average to mitigate these risks. Prolonged or repeated exposure has been linked to potential mutagenic effects and chronic organ toxicity in animal models. However, the EPA classifies its carcinogenic potential in humans as "cannot be determined" due to species-specific metabolic differences (specifically the activity of the CYP2E1 enzyme in mouse kidneys but not in humans).

== See also ==
- Bromomethane
- Dichloromethane
- Trichloromethane (chloroform)
- Tetrachloromethane (carbon tetrachloride)
