= Monohalomethane =

Structural formula				
Name	Fluoromethane; Methyl fluoride	Chloromethane; Methyl chloride	Bromomethane; Methyl bromide	Iodomethane; Methyl iodide
Melting point	−137,8 °C	−97,4 °C	−93,7 °C	−66 °C
Boiling point	−78,4 °C	−23,8 °C	4,0 °C	42 °C
Space-filling model				

The monohalomethanes are organic compounds in which a hydrogen atom in methane is replaced by a halogen. They belong to the haloalkanes or to the subgroup of halomethanes.

The four common (Note: Highly radioactive CH_{3}At (methyl astatide) has been detected. The known isotopes of even heavier group 17 element, tennessine, are too short-lived to allow for chemical experimentation.) members are fluoromethane, chloromethane, bromomethane and iodomethane.

Historical name for this group is methyl halides; it's still widely used. The compounds of this class are often described as CH_{3}X or MeX (X - any halogen, Me - methyl group).

== Related compounds ==
There are analogs with more than one hydrogen atom in methane is replaced by a halogen:

- Dihalomethane, CH_{2}X_{2}, two hydrogen atoms replaced
- Trihalomethane, CHX_{3}, three hydrogen atoms replaced
- Tetrahalomethane, CX_{4}, all four hydrogen atoms replaced

Analogs with carbon atom replaced with a heavier group 14 element are also known:

- Monohalosilane, SiH_{3}X (with silicon, related to silane)
- Monohalogermane, GeH_{3}X (with germanium, related to germane)
- Monohalostannane, SnH_{3}X (with tin, related to stannane)

== See also ==
- Methyl halide transferase – An enzyme producing some methyl halides
