= MCTS =

MCTS may reference:

- Marine Communications and Traffic Services, a radio service operated by the Canadian Coast Guard which provides vessel traffic and marine weather information
- Microsoft Certified Technology Specialist, a professional certification from Microsoft
- Middelburg Center for Transatlantic Studies
- Milwaukee County Transit System
- Monte Carlo tree search – a heuristic search algorithm based on the Monte Carlo method
- Multiple Console Time Sharing System, a 1970s operating system developed by General Motors Research Laboratory
- Munich Center for Technology in Society, a research center at the Technical University of Munich
- Mercer County Technical Schools, a vocational public school district in Mercer County, New Jersey, United States

== See also ==
- MCT (disambiguation); MCTs plural form of MCT
