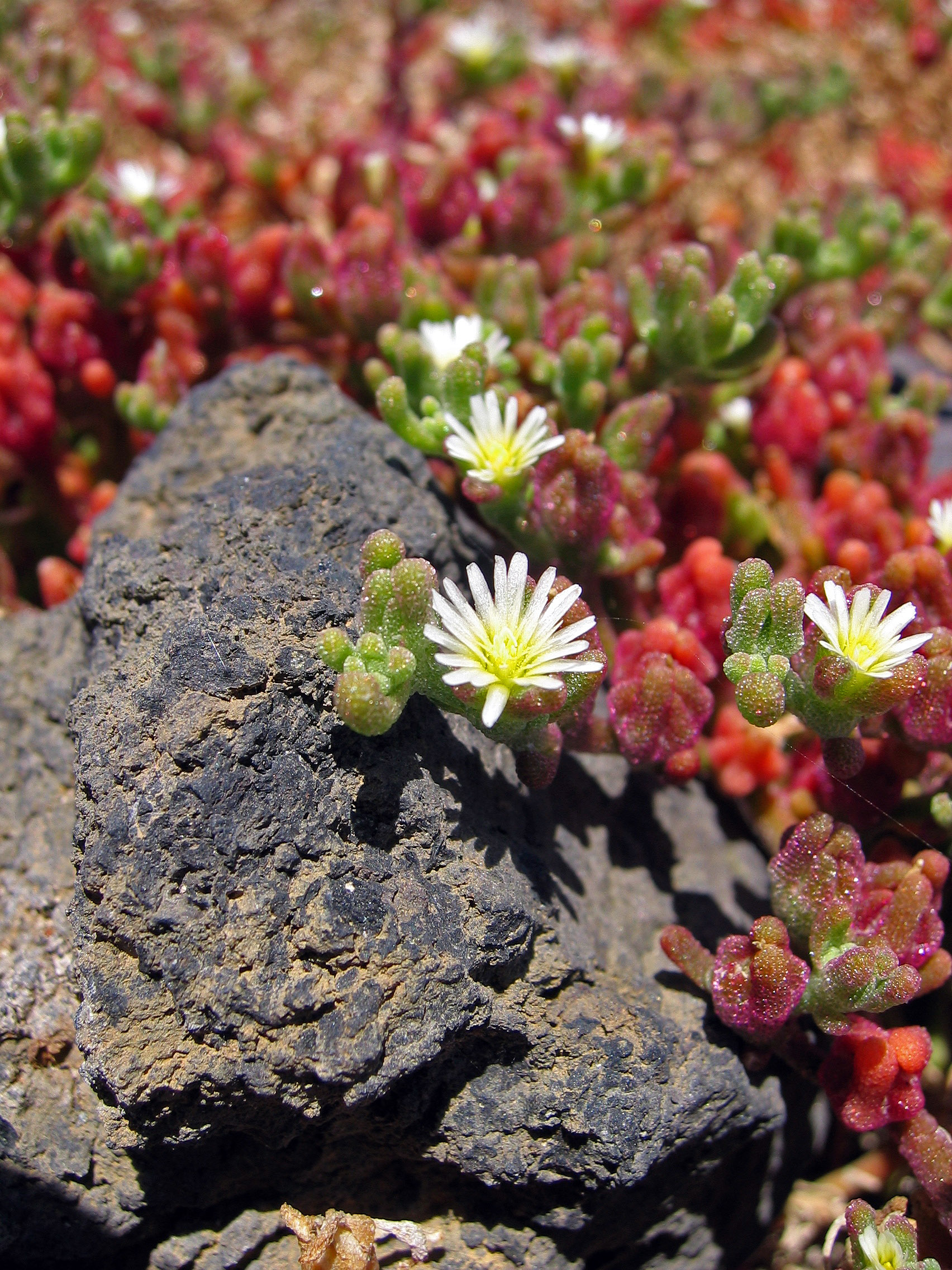

Scientific classification
- Kingdom: Plantae
- Clade: Tracheophytes
- Clade: Angiosperms
- Clade: Eudicots
- Order: Caryophyllales
- Family: Aizoaceae
- Genus: Mesembryanthemum
- Species: M. nodiflorum

Binomial name
- Mesembryanthemum nodiflorum L.

= Mesembryanthemum nodiflorum =

Species of flowering plant

Mesembryanthemum nodiflorum is a species of succulent plant in the genus Mesembryanthemum known by the common name slenderleaf iceplant. It is the type species for the genus. It is native to South Africa but can also be found in coastal areas of the Mediterranean Basin, Macaronesia, and Middle East. It is known in many other places as an introduced species and sometimes an invasive weed, including several regions of Australia, parts of the western United States and adjacent Mexico, and some Atlantic islands.

M. nodiflorum is a usually annual herb forming a mostly prostrate clump or mat of stems up to a maximum of about 20 centimeters in length. The small stem branches are lined with knob-like cylindrical fleshy leaves up to 2 centimeters long. The herbage is green to bright red and visibly bumpy with shiny, bubble-like papillae. Flowers are solitary or borne in loose clusters. Each is about half a centimeter wide with many narrow to thready white or pale yellow petals. The fruit is a capsule which opens when it becomes wet, releasing seeds.
