= Methyl halide transferase =

Identifiers
- EC no.: 2.1.1.165

Databases
- IntEnz: IntEnz view
- BRENDA: BRENDA entry
- ExPASy: NiceZyme view
- KEGG: KEGG entry
- MetaCyc: metabolic pathway
- PRIAM: profile
- PDB structures: RCSB PDB PDBe PDBsum
Search
- PMC: articles
- PubMed: articles
- NCBI: proteins

Methyl halide transferase (EC 2.1.1.165, MCT, methyl chloride transferase, S-adenosyl-L-methionine:halide/bisulfide methyltransferase, AtHOL1, AtHOL2, AtHOL3, HMT, S-adenosyl-L-methionine: halide ion methyltransferase, SAM:halide ion methyltransferase) is an enzyme with systematic name S-adenosylmethionine:iodide methyltransferase. This enzyme catalyses the following chemical reaction

S-adenosyl-L-methionine + iodide $\rightleftharpoons$ S-adenosyl-L-homocysteine + methyl iodide

This enzyme contributes to the methyl halide emissions from Arabidopsis thaliana.

== Chloride transfer ==
The salt marsh plant Batis maritima contains the enzyme methyl chloride transferase that catalyzes the synthesis of chloromethane (CH_{3}Cl) from S-adenosine-L-methionine and chloride. This protein has been purified and expressed in E. coli, and seems to be present in other organisms such as white rot fungi (Phellinus pomaceus), red algae (Endocladia muricata), and the ice plant (Mesembryanthemum crystallinum), each of which is a known CH_{3}Cl producer.
