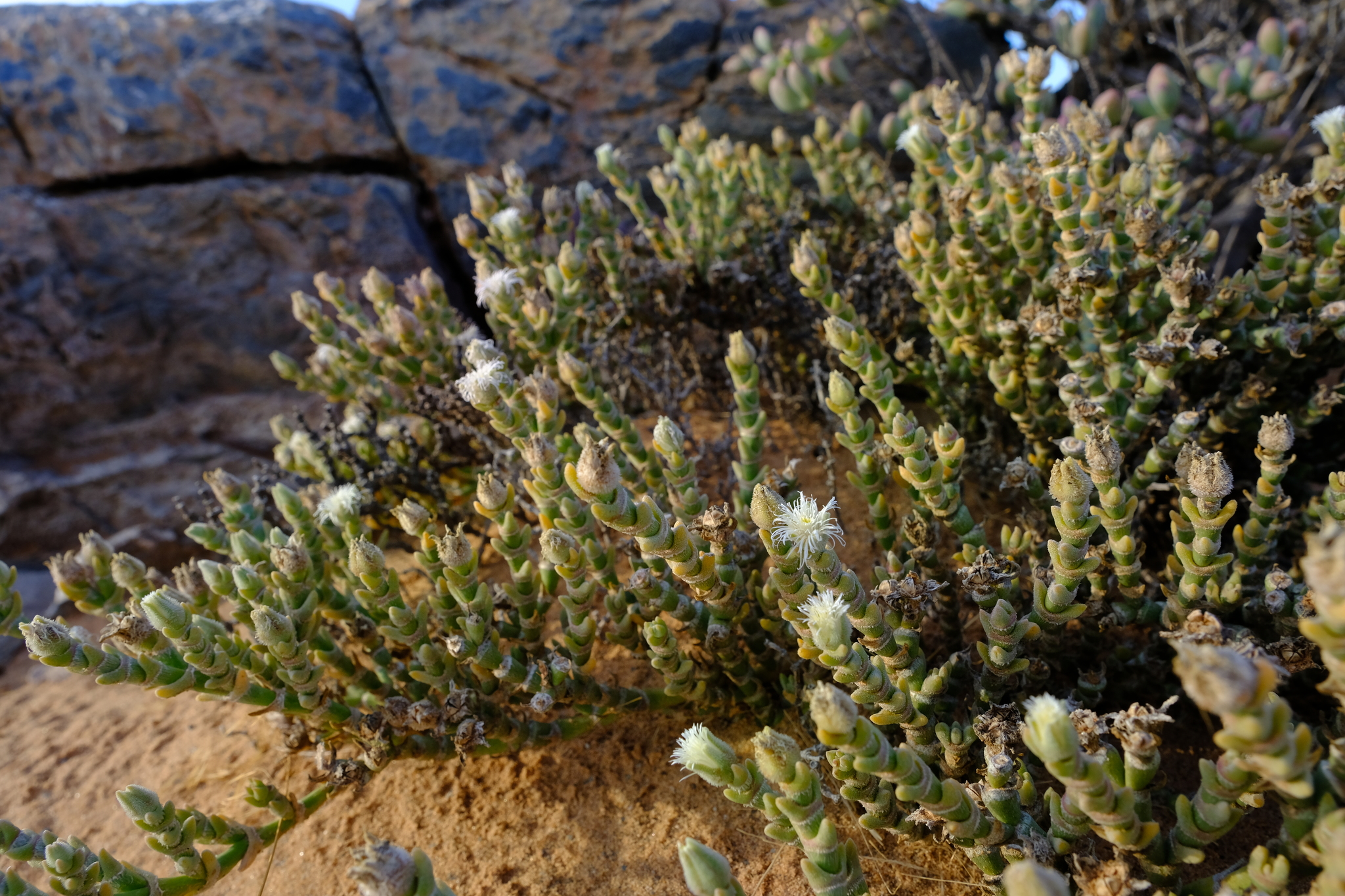
- Near Sanddrif, South Africa

Conservation status
- Least Concern (IUCN 3.1)

Scientific classification
- Kingdom: Plantae
- Clade: Embryophytes
- Clade: Tracheophytes
- Clade: Angiosperms
- Clade: Eudicots
- Order: Caryophyllales
- Family: Aizoaceae
- Genus: Mesembryanthemum
- Species: M. tomentosum

Binomial name
- Mesembryanthemum tomentosum Klak

Synonyms
- Arenifera pillansii (L.Bolus) Herre; Brownanthus pubescens (N.E.Br. ex C.A.Maass) Bullock; Psammophora pillansii L.Bolus; Psilocaulon pillansii (L.Bolus) Friedrich; Trichocyclus buchubergensis Dinter, nom. nud.; Trichocyclus pillansii L.Bolus; Trichocyclus pubescens N.E.Br. ex C.A.Maass

= Mesembryanthemum tomentosum =

Species of succulent

Mesembryanthemum tomentosum, synonyms including Brownanthus pubescens, is a species of plant in the family Aizoaceae. It is native to the Cape Provinces and Namibia. Its natural habitats are dry savanna and rocky areas.

== Taxonomy ==
The species was first described by Nicholas Edward Brown in 1928 as Trichocyclus pubescens. It was transferred to the genus Brownanthus by Arthur Allman Bullock in 1937 (as Brownanthus pubescens). A molecular phylogenetic study in 2007 concluded that Brownanthus was embedded in Mesembryanthemum, which as then circumscribed was not monophyletic. Accordingly, all the species of Brownanthus were transferred to an enlarged Mesembryanthemum. As the name Mesembryanthemum pubescens had already been used in 1795 for a different species (now Gibbaeum pubescens), a replacement name was needed, and Brownanthus pubescens became Mesembryanthemum tomentosum.
