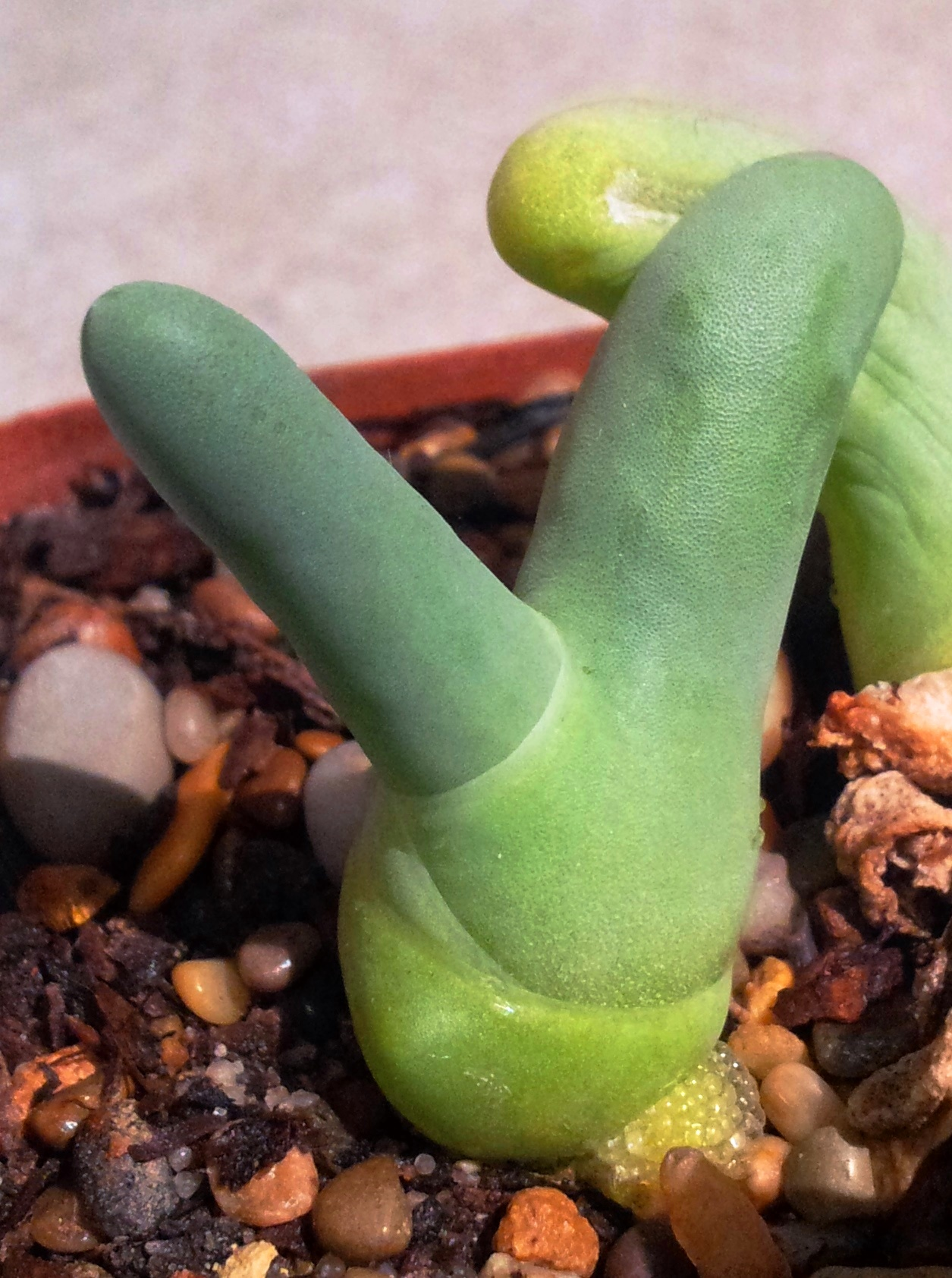
- Potted M. digitatum

Scientific classification
- Kingdom: Plantae
- Clade: Tracheophytes
- Clade: Angiosperms
- Clade: Eudicots
- Order: Caryophyllales
- Family: Aizoaceae
- Genus: Mesembryanthemum
- Species: M. digitatum

Binomial name
- Mesembryanthemum digitatum (Aiton)

Synonyms
- Dactylopsis digitata; Phyllobolus digitatus

= Mesembryanthemum digitatum =

Species of plant

Mesembryanthemum digitatum, or finger-and-thumb plant, is a stemless plant found in South Africa with a clump of 2–4 thick, waxy leaves per shoot that emerge from the ground which resemble human-like fingers.

== Description ==
The species resembles dwarf shrubs, with their cylindrical leaves reaching only about 10 cm high. Their epidermis consists of bladder cells, which are tiny hair-like structures that help the plant retain water, especially during times of drought. M. digitatum grows white or cream-colored flowers that begin to bloom in late winter. The flower sepals and petaloid staminodes fused together to form wispy linear tubes concentrically aligned around a shell-shaped nectary. Fruits produced by the flowers contain fused valve wings and five locules with light brown seeds. M. digitatum roots are fasciculate or arranged in a bundle. Due to the resemblance of M. digitatum leaves to fingers, the species name "digitatum" is derived from Latin, and it means "to have fingers".

== Taxonomy ==
Mesembryanthemum digitatum is in the subfamily Mesembryanthemoideae which is one of four subfamilies in the family Aizoaceae, which are known as the stone plants. Stone plants are a group of succulent plants that are native to Southern Africa. They are named "stone plants" due to their resemblance to rocks, which helps them avoid being consumed by herbivores. Members of genus Mesembryanthemum contain bladder cells to help them retain water during droughts.

== Distribution and habitat ==
Mesembryanthemum digitatum is native to Cape Province in South Africa. These plants are abundant specifically in Karoo of South Africa, which has the perfect environment for this plant to thrive in, including winter rainfall, rocky and sandy soil, and a warm, arid climate.

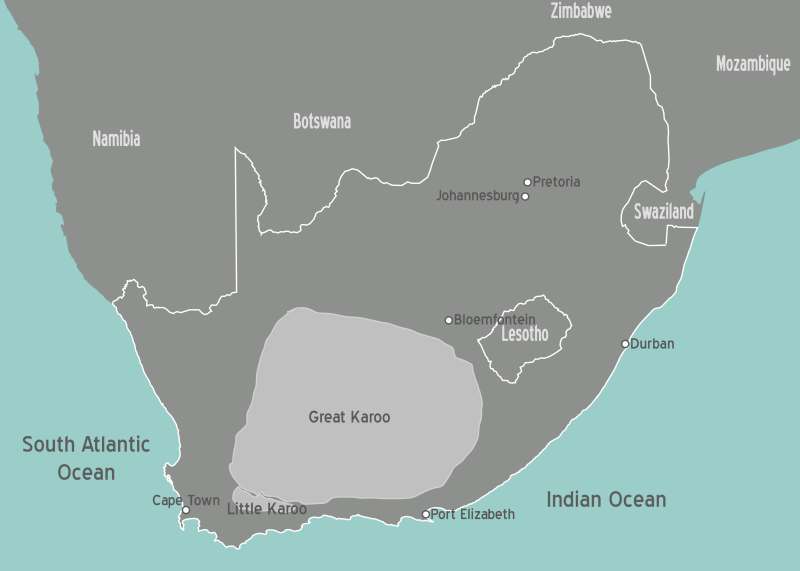
Location of the Great Karoo Desert in South Africa where M. digitatum originates from.

== Cultivation ==
Like most succulents, Mesembryanthemum digitatum needs a warm climate and does not tolerate over-watering, as it retains water very well. Therefore, the plant must only be watered when the soil is dry, and the soil must drain well. These plants do require a lot of sunlight, so keeping them outside or near a window is pertinent. Last, M. digitatum is a perennial, but does not tolerate extremely cold winters, so it is essential to keep the plant indoors depending on the region and to make sure they do not frost. Seeds should be planted at the end of spring frosting near the end of May, which is a perfect time for their flowers to bloom. Seeds will take around three weeks to germinate.
