= Mesembryanthemum namibense =

Conservation status
- Least Concern (IUCN 3.1)

Scientific classification
- Kingdom: Plantae
- Clade: Tracheophytes
- Clade: Angiosperms
- Clade: Eudicots
- Order: Caryophyllales
- Family: Aizoaceae
- Genus: Mesembryanthemum
- Species: M. namibense

Binomial name
- Mesembryanthemum namibense Marloth

Synonyms
- Brownanthus namibensis (Marloth) Bullock; Psilocaulon namibense (Marloth) Friedrich; Trichocyclus namibensis (Marloth) N.E.Br. ex Maass

Species of succulent

Mesembryanthemum namibense, synonym Brownanthus namibensis, is a species of flowering plant in the family Aizoaceae. It is endemic to Namibia. Its natural habitat is rocky areas. It is threatened by habitat loss.
