= Chloromethane (data page) =

Chemical data page

This page provides supplementary chemical data on chloromethane.

== Safety data sheet ==
The handling of this chemical may incur notable safety precautions. It is highly recommended that you seek the safety data sheet for this chemical from a reliable source such as SIRI, and follow its directions. SDS for chloromethane is available at Supelco Inc

== Structure and properties ==
Structure and properties
Index of refraction, n_{D}	1.3389
Abbe number	?
Dielectric constant, ε_{r}	12.9 ε_{0} at 25 °C
Bond strength	?
Bond length	?
Bond angle	?
Dipole moment	1.9 D
Magnetic susceptibility	?
Acentric factor	0.153
Critical compressibility	0.268247
Compressibility factor	0.985
Density	1002.9 kg/m^{3} at -24.2 °C (liquid); 2.55 kg/m^{3} at -24.2 °C (gas); 2.22 kg/m^{3} at 0 °C (gas); 2.134 kg/m^{3} at 15 °C (gas)
Surface tension	19.5 dyn/cm at 0 °C; 17.8 dyn/cm at 10 °C; 16.2 dyn/cm at 20 °C
Viscosity	0.2280 mPa·s at 0 °C; 0.1784 mPa·s at 20 °C; 0.1440 mPa·s at 40 °C
Thermal conductivity	10.5 mW/(m·K) at 0 °C

== Thermodynamic properties ==
Phase behavior
Triple point	175.43 K (–97.72 °C), 870 Pa
Critical point	416 K (143 °C), 6714.4 kPa
Std enthalpy change of fusion, Δ_{fus}H^{~~o~~}	6.43 kJ/mol
Std entropy change of fusion, Δ_{fus}S^{~~o~~}	36.66 J/(mol·K)
Std enthalpy change of vaporization, Δ_{vap}H^{~~o~~}	21.535 kJ/mol at –24.21 °C; 20.09 kJ/mol at 20 °C
Std entropy change of vaporization, Δ_{vap}S^{~~o~~}	86.51 J/(mol·K) at –24.21 °C
Solid properties
Std enthalpy change of formation, Δ_{f}H^{~~o~~}_{solid}	? kJ/mol
Standard molar entropy, S^{~~o~~}_{solid}	? J/(mol K)
Heat capacity, c_{p}	? J/(mol K)
Liquid properties
Std enthalpy change of formation, Δ_{f}H^{~~o~~}_{liquid}	–86.37 kJ/mol at 25 °C
Standard molar entropy, S^{~~o~~}_{liquid}	140.08 J/(mol K)
Heat capacity, c_{p}	81.2 J/(mol K) at 15 °C
Gas properties
Std enthalpy change of formation, Δ_{f}H^{~~o~~}_{gas}	–83.68 kJ/mol
Standard molar entropy, S^{~~o~~}_{gas}	234.36 J/(mol K) at 100 kPa
Enthalpy of combustion, Δ_{c}H^{~~o~~}_{gas}	–764.0 kJ/mol
Heat capacity, c_{p}	40.70 J/(mol K) at 25 °C
van der Waals' constants	a = 757.0 L^{2} kPa/mol^{2} b = 0.06483 liter per mole

== Vapor pressure of liquid ==
P in mm Hg	1	10	40	100	400	760	1520	3800	7600	15200	30400	45600
T in °C	—	–92.4	–76.0	–63.0	–38.0	–24.0	–6.4	22.0	47.3	77.3	113.8	137.5

Table data obtained from CRC Handbook of Chemistry and Physics 44th ed.

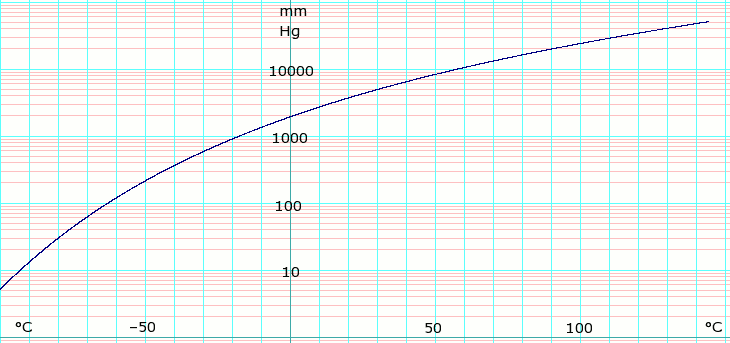
log_{10} of Methyl Chloride vapor pressure. Uses formula: $\scriptstyle \log_e P_{mmHg} =$$\scriptstyle \log_e (\frac {760} {101.325}) - 7.072977\log_e(T+273.15) - \frac {4094.935} {T+273.15} + 59.41150 + 1.092121 \times 10^{-5} (T+273.15)^2$ obtained from CHERIC

== Spectral data ==
UV-Vis
λ_{max}	? nm
Extinction coefficient, ε	?
IR
Major absorption bands	? cm^{−1}
NMR
Proton NMR
Carbon-13 NMR
Other NMR data
MS
Masses of main fragments
