= Mesembryanthemum lancifolium =

Scientific classification
- Kingdom: Plantae
- Clade: Embryophytes
- Clade: Tracheophytes
- Clade: Angiosperms
- Clade: Eudicots
- Order: Caryophyllales
- Family: Aizoaceae
- Genus: Mesembryanthemum
- Species: M. lancifolium

Binomial name
- Mesembryanthemum lancifolium (L. Bol.) Klak

Synonyms
- Aptenia lancifolia

Species of plant

Mesembryanthemum lancifolium is a species of plant in the family Aizoaceae (ice plants). They are succulent plants.

== Sources ==
This article incorporates text from a free content work. Licensed under CC0 (license statement/permission). Text taken from Mesembryanthemum lancifolium. Encyclopedia of Life.
