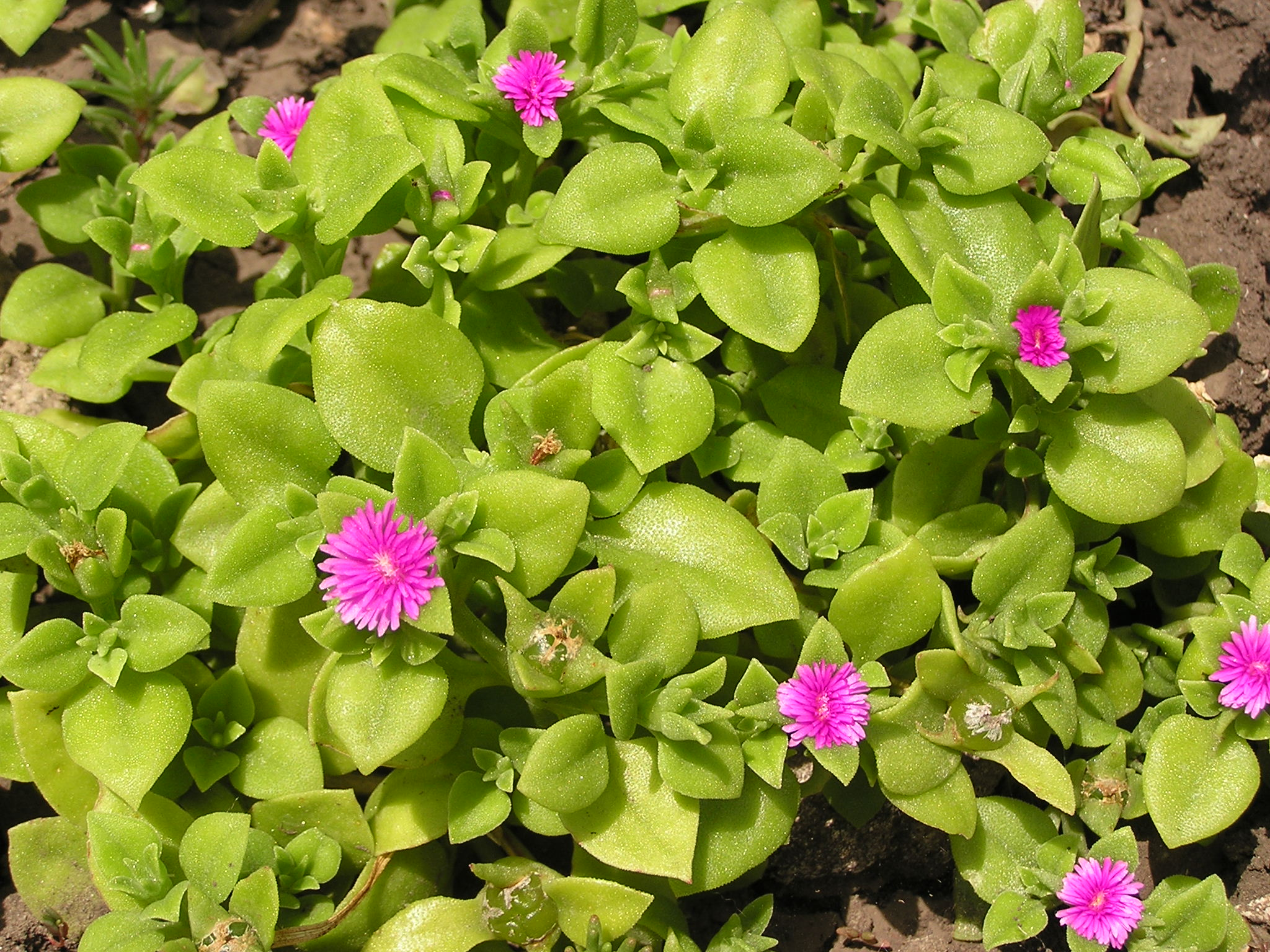

Scientific classification
- Kingdom: Plantae
- Clade: Tracheophytes
- Clade: Angiosperms
- Clade: Eudicots
- Order: Caryophyllales
- Family: Aizoaceae
- Genus: Mesembryanthemum
- Species: M. cordifolium

Binomial name
- Mesembryanthemum cordifolium L.f.

Synonyms
- Aptenia cordifolia (L.f.) Schwantes; Litocarpus cordifolius (L.f.) L.Bolus; Ludolfia cordifolius (L.f.) L.Bolus; Tetracoilanthus cordifolius (L.f.) Rappa & Cammarone

= Mesembryanthemum cordifolium =

Species of plant

Mesembryanthemum cordifolium, formerly known as Aptenia cordifolia, is a species of succulent plant in the family Aizoaceae. It is a creeping plant that forms a carpet of flat-growing perennial herbs in groups on the ground from a base. The genus name means middle-embryo flower in reference to the position of the ovary in the flower. The specific epithet is derived from Latin for heart-shaped leaves.

== Description ==
This is a succulent, creeping, short-lived, mat-forming perennial herb growing in flat clumps on the ground from a woody base. Plants only rise to about 10 centimetres (3.9 in) tall but prostrate stems reach up to about 60 centimetres (24 in) long. The stems are green and stalk-round. The fleshy, small leaves are opposite, ovate to cordate, about 2.5 centimetres (0.98 in) long and covered with fine papillae.

Bright pink to purplish solitary flowers appear in the leaf axils, open during the day but close up at night and remain closed on cloudy days. These colored whorls are not petals, but non-functional modified stamens. Normal stamens are yellow. Flowers bloom primarily from spring to fall. The fruit is a capsule of little more than one centimeter in length with millimeter brown tuberose seeds. There is a variegated form.

== Names ==
The common names of the plant include baby sun rose, heart-leaf, red aptenia or aptenia in English, as well as rooi brakvygie or brakvygie in Afrikaans, and umjuluka, ibohlololo, or uncolozi omncane in isiZulu in South Africa. It is known as heartleaf iceplant in the U.S. British names may be heart-leaved aptenia or heart-leaved midday flower because, like many other representatives of the Aizoaceae, it opens its flowers only during the sunshine of the day.

== Taxonomy ==
Mesembryanthemum cordifolium is an accepted name according to "The Plant List" database, the primary source for the modern APG taxonomy of flowering plants. Formerly placed in the genus Aptenia and known as A. cordifolia, it was included in Mesembryanthemum in 2007 when the whole genus Aptenia was reduced to synonymy.

Perhaps the most common plant seen under this name in gardens is actually Mesembryanthemum 'Red Apple', a hybrid with more vigorous growth, red flowers and bright green leaves, whose parents are M. cordifolium and M. haeckelianum. The true species of M. cordifolium has magenta-purple flowers and more heart-shaped, mid-green, textured leaves.

== Distribution ==
Native to the Eastern Cape Province of South Africa, this species has become widely known as an ornamental plant. Today it can be found growing in Australia, escaped gardens and naturalized in some parts of California, Oregon and Florida, in the Mediterranean region of the Europe and in central Mexico. The plant was recently determined to be invasive in California and was listed as a wildland weed red alert.

== Uses ==
The primary use of the plant is ornamental. The locals of the region of origin use the plant for its anti-inflammatory properties.

M. cordifolium (A. cordifolia) contains the serotonin reuptake inhibitor and monoamine releasing agent alkaloid mesembrine and demethylmesembrenol. It was found to contain the second highest levels of mesembrine in an analysis of 21 different plants. These alkaloids can also be found in Kanna (Sceletium tortuosum). Mesembrine likely plays a dominant role in the antidepressant effects of Sceletium tortuosum.

=== Cultivation ===
Mesembryanthemum cordifolium can be planted as a fast-growing, not hardy, groundcover in flower boxes and around traffic lights. The plant needs a sunny spot and well drained soil. This plant is also ideal for covering walls, rockeries and areas bare of grass. Due to its quick growth, it is useful to prevent the growth of weeds in the field where it is planted. It can also survive without problems in a pot, where it is grown in hanging baskets so the long trailing branches can hang down with their leaves spaced out. Over-wintering should take place in a frost-free, sunny place at approximately 5 to 8 °C (41 to 46 °F). No serious insect or disease problems are known. In addition to the species and the hybrid 'Red Apple', one also encounters the variety A. x. 'Mezoo', a mutant of 'Red Apple' whose variegated leaves have creamy white edges, and rarely on a white-flowering form.

=== Propagation ===
It easily reproduces from cuttings of the developed stems, roots, seeds of its capsular fruit, and even from its own buried leaves. Seeds must be sowed in summer and cuttings can be done in early spring in cooler climates. For cuttings, the plant can be divided and runners can be planted directly into the ground. The garden bed must be readied by digging over the soil. Compost and a slow-release fertilizer may be added to ensure healthy growth. With regard to risks, it is very resistant to drought, but with moist soil it grows rapidly. It prefers soil with good drainage. It cannot withstand frost, where it freezes below −5 °C (23 °F).

== Gallery ==
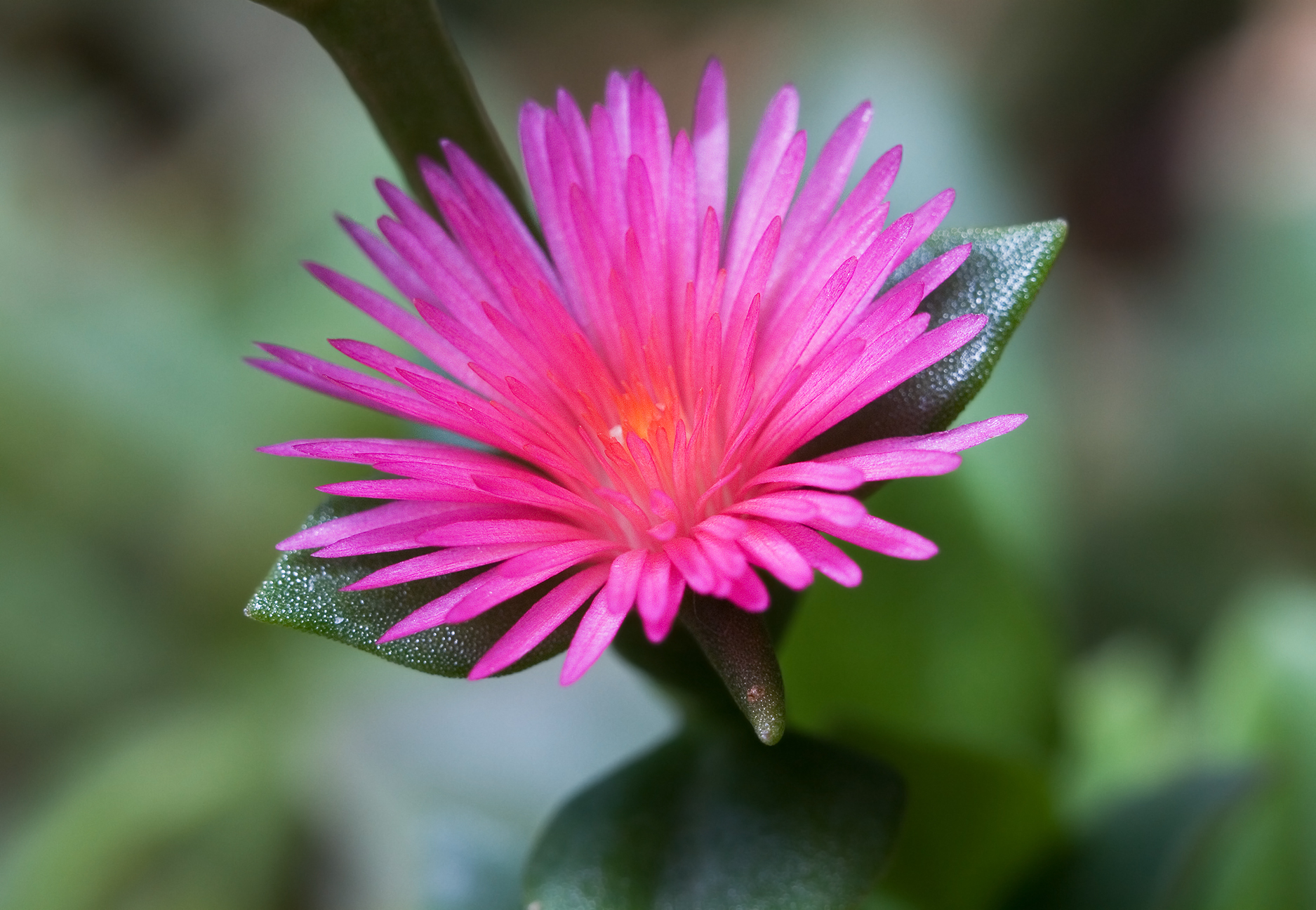
Flower

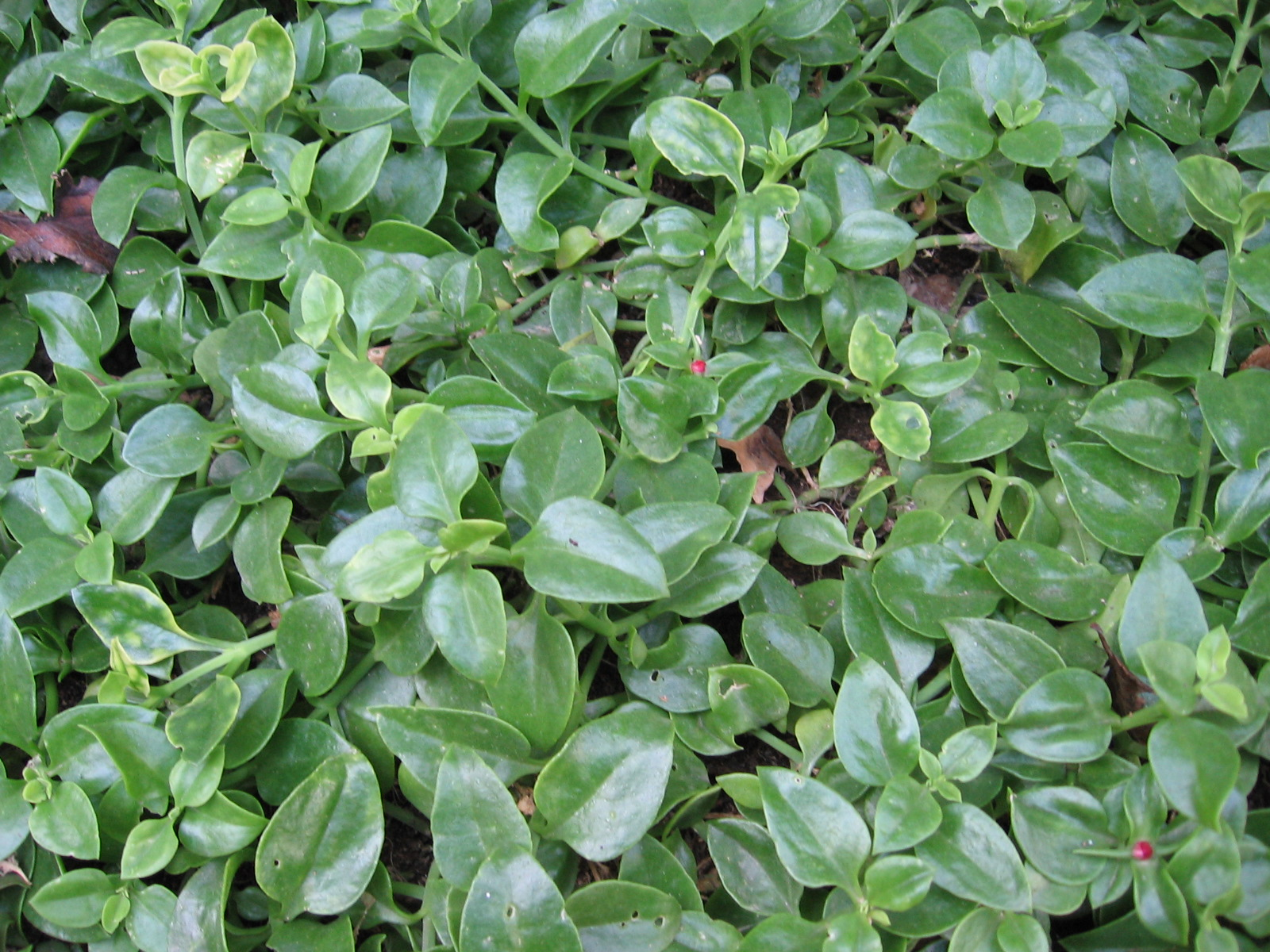
On ground
