= Methyl astatide =

Names
- Preferred IUPAC name ~~methyl(^{211}At)astatine-211~~
- Other names Astatomethane Methylastatine

Identifiers
3D model (JSmol)	Interactive image
PubChem CID	140876399
- InChI: InChI=1S/CH3At/c1-2/h1H3/i2+1 Key: BWJBVRGGDDLNAZ-VQEHIDDOSA-N
- SMILES: C[At]

Properties
Chemical formula	CH_{3}At
Molar mass	225 g·mol^{−1}
- Except where otherwise noted, data are given for materials in their standard state (at 25 °C [77 °F], 100 kPa). Infobox references

Methyl astatide is an organoastatine chemical compound with the formula CH_{3}At. In terms of chemical structure, it is related to methane by replacement of one hydrogen atom by an atom of astatine, the rarest natural halogen element.

== Occurrence ==
It has been detected as a chemical species but is difficult to study due to the radioactivity of astatine isotopes and small amounts of the compound. Due to the rarity and radioactivity of astatine, methyl astatide is a highly specialized compound primarily of interest in nuclear chemistry and advanced research contexts.

== Synthesis ==
Research papers suggest methods for incorporating astatine into organic compounds, similar to radioiodination, including the reaction of astatine with certain organic precursors.
