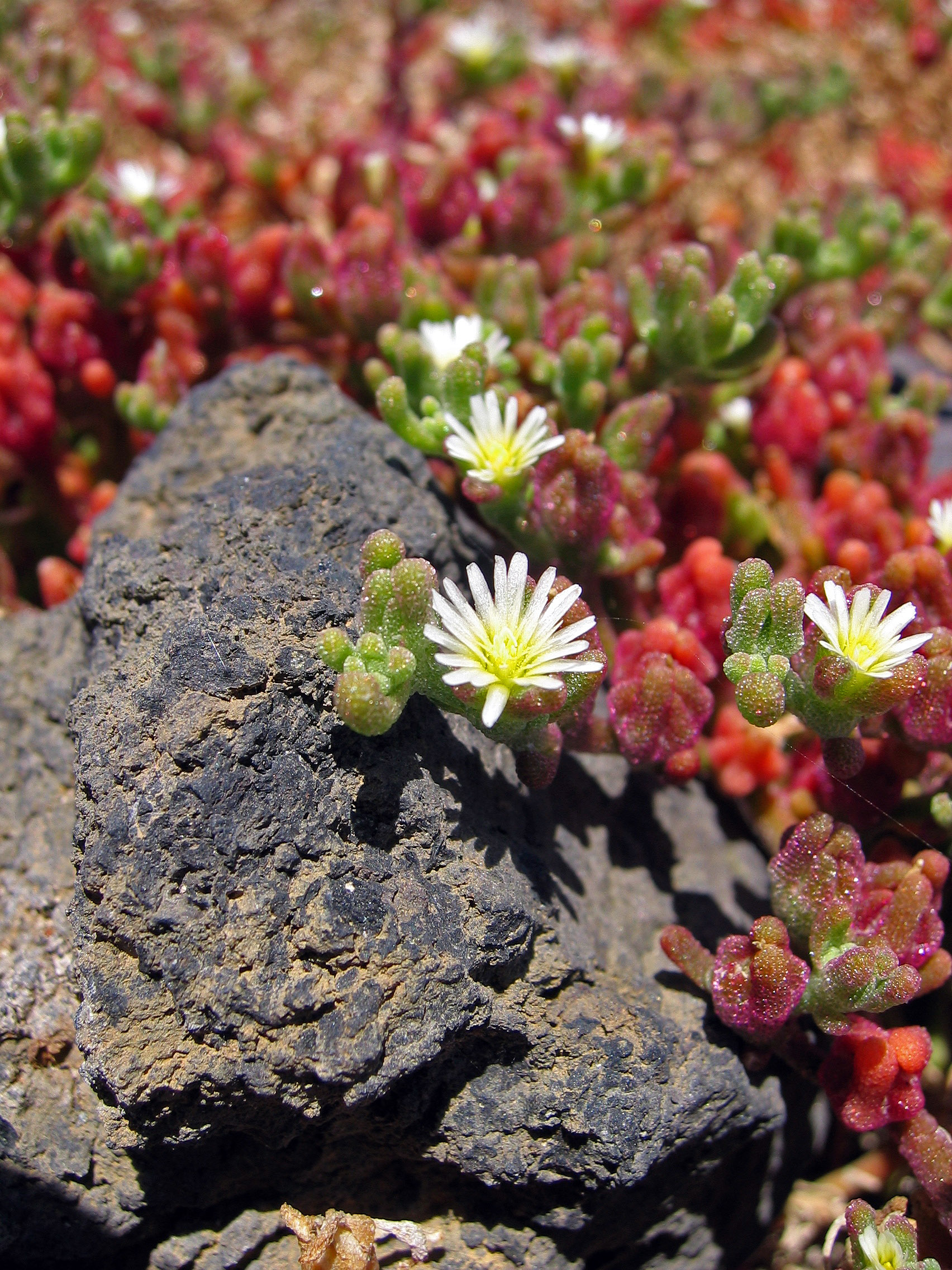
- Mesembryanthemum nodiflorum

Scientific classification
- Kingdom: Plantae
- Clade: Embryophytes
- Clade: Tracheophytes
- Clade: Angiosperms
- Clade: Eudicots
- Order: Caryophyllales
- Family: Aizoaceae
- Subfamily: Mesembryanthemoideae
- Genus: Mesembryanthemum; L.

Species
- See text for accepted species

Synonyms
- Amoebophyllum N.E.Br.; Aptenia N.E.Br.; Arenifera Herre; Aridaria N.E.Br.; Aspazoma N.E.Br.; Brownanthus Schwantes; Callistigma Dinter & Schwantes; Caulipsolon Klak; Cryophytum N.E.Br.; Dactylopsis N.E.Br.; Derenbergiella Schwantes; Eurystigma L.Bolus; Ficoides Mill.; Gasoul Adans., nom. superfl.; Gynicidia Neck., opus utique oppr.; Halenbergia Dinter ex H.Jacobsen; Hydrodea N.E.Br.; Litocarpus L.Bolus, nom. superfl.; Manettia Adans., nom. rej.; Mesembryanthes Stokes; Mesembryanthus Raf.; Mesembryum Adans.; Neo-aridaria A.G.J.Herre, no Latin descr.; Nycteranthus Neck. ex Rothm.; Nycterianthemum Haw.; Opophytum N.E.Br.; Pentacoilanthus Rappa & Camarrone; Perapentacoilanthus Rappa & Camarrone; Phyllobolus N.E.Br.; Platythyra N.E.Br.; Prenia N.E.Br.; Pseudobrownanthus Ihlenf. & Bittrich; Psilocaulon N.E.Br.; Sceletium N.E.Br.; Sphalmanthus N.E.Br.; Synaptophyllum N.E.Br.; Tetracoilanthus Rappa & Camarrone, nom. superfl.; Trichocyclus N.E.Br.; Volkeranthus Gerbaulet

= Mesembryanthemum =

Genus of plants

Mesembryanthemum is a genus of flowering plants in the family Aizoaceae, indigenous to southern Africa. As with many members of that family, it is characterized by long-lasting flower heads. Flowers of Mesembryanthemum protect close at night-time but open in sunlight. Where sun, dew, frost, wind or predators are likely to damage exposed reproductive organs, closing may be advantageous during times when flowers are unlikely to attract pollinators.

Many Mesembryanthemum species are known as ice plants because of the glistening globular bladder cells covering their stems, fruit and leaves, "... they sparkle like ice crystals". In South Africa, Mesembryanthemums are known as "vygies" (from Afrikaans "vy"), although that term refers to many plants in the family Aizoaceae.

Species formerly placed in Mesembryanthemum have been transferred to other genera, such as Cleretum and Carpobrotus, although sources differ.

== Etymology ==
Jacob Breyne coined the name of the flower in 1684, using the spelling Mesembrianthemum ("midday flower"), from the Greek roots μεσημβρία, meaning "noon", and ἄνθεμον, meaning "flower", because the species known in his time flowered at midday. In 1719, with the discovery that some species flowered at night, Johann Jacob Dillenius changed the spelling to Mesembryanthemum ("flower with the pistil in the center"), rederiving the first part of the word from Greek μεσος ("middle") and ἔμβρυον ("pistil" or "embryo"). Carl Linnaeus used the Dillenius spelling (with the "y") in his description of the Mesembryanthemum species and the International Code of Botanical Nomenclature requires the retention of the original, deliberate spelling.

== Description ==
Raphides are found in abundance in this genus.

== Uses ==
Mesembryanthemums are often cultivated as ornamental plants for their showy flowers. Ornamental plants may escape into the wild and consequently have become widely naturalized outside their native range. They are considered an invasive weed in certain places.

== Culture and society ==
Some Mesembryanthemum species are thought to be hallucinogenic plants, like related Aizoaceae, and as such may be subject to legal restrictions (e.g., Louisiana State Act 159).

== Species ==
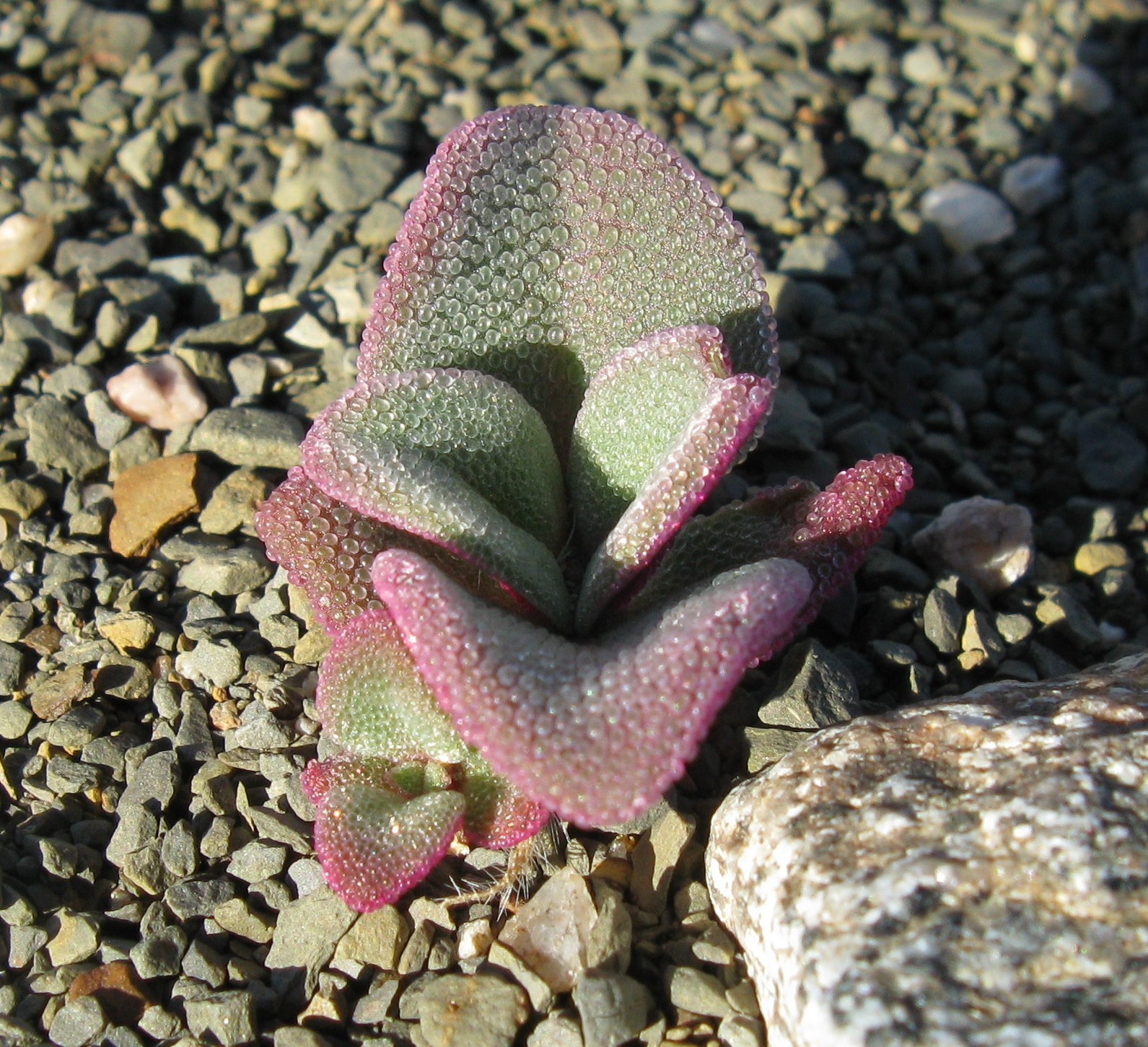
Mesembryanthemum guerichianum

As of March 2019, Plants of the World Online accepted the following 108 species:

- Mesembryanthemum aitonis Jacq.
- Mesembryanthemum alatum (L.Bolus) L.Bolus
- Mesembryanthemum amabile (Gerbaulet & Struck) Klak
- Mesembryanthemum amplectens L.Bolus
- Mesembryanthemum archeri (L.Bolus) Klak
- Mesembryanthemum arenarium (N.E.Br.) L.Bolus
- Mesembryanthemum articulatum Thunb.
- Mesembryanthemum barklyi N.E.Br.
- Mesembryanthemum baylissii (L.Bolus) Klak
- Mesembryanthemum bicorne Sond.
- Mesembryanthemum brevicarpum (L.Bolus) Klak
- Mesembryanthemum bulletrapense Klak
- Mesembryanthemum canaliculatum Haw.
- Mesembryanthemum caudatum L.Bolus
- Mesembryanthemum chrysophthalmum (Gerbaulet & Struck) Klak
- Mesembryanthemum clandestinum Haw.
- Mesembryanthemum corallinum Thunb.
- Mesembryanthemum cordifolium L.f.
- Mesembryanthemum coriarium Burch.
- Mesembryanthemum crassicaule Haw.
- Mesembryanthemum cryptanthum Hook.f.
- Mesembryanthemum crystallinum L.
- Mesembryanthemum deciduum (L.Bolus) Klak
- Mesembryanthemum decurvatum (L.Bolus) Klak
- Mesembryanthemum delum L.Bolus
- Mesembryanthemum digitatum Aiton
- Mesembryanthemum dimorphum Welw. ex Oliv.
- Mesembryanthemum dinteri Engl.
- Mesembryanthemum emarcidum Thunb.
- Mesembryanthemum englishiae L.Bolus
- Mesembryanthemum eurystigmatum Gerbaulet
- Mesembryanthemum exalatum (Gerbaulet) Klak
- Mesembryanthemum excavatum L.Bolus
- Mesembryanthemum expansum L.
- Mesembryanthemum fastigiatum Thunb.
- Mesembryanthemum flavidum Klak
- Mesembryanthemum gariepense (Gerbaulet & Struck) Klak
- Mesembryanthemum gariusanum Dinter
- Mesembryanthemum geniculiflorum L.
- Mesembryanthemum gessertianum Dinter & A.Berger
- Mesembryanthemum glareicola (Klak) Klak
- Mesembryanthemum granulicaule Haw.
- Mesembryanthemum grossum Aiton
- Mesembryanthemum guerichianum Pax
- Mesembryanthemum haeckelianum A.Berger
- Mesembryanthemum holense Klak
- Mesembryanthemum hypertrophicum Dinter
- Mesembryanthemum inachabense Engl.
- Mesembryanthemum junceum Haw.
- Mesembryanthemum juttae Dinter & A.Berger
- Mesembryanthemum knolfonteinense Klak
- Mesembryanthemum kuntzei Schinz
- Mesembryanthemum ladismithiense Klak
- Mesembryanthemum lancifolium (L.Bolus) Klak
- Mesembryanthemum latipetalum (L.Bolus) Klak
- Mesembryanthemum leptarthron A.Berger
- Mesembryanthemum lignescens (L.Bolus) Klak
- Mesembryanthemum ligneum (L.Bolus) Klak
- Mesembryanthemum lilliputanum Klak
- Mesembryanthemum longipapillosum Dinter
- Mesembryanthemum longistylum DC.
- Mesembryanthemum marlothii Pax
- Mesembryanthemum namibense Marloth
- Mesembryanthemum napierense Klak
- Mesembryanthemum neglectum (S.M.Pierce & Gerbaulet) Klak
- Mesembryanthemum neofoliosum Klak
- Mesembryanthemum nitidum Haw.
- Mesembryanthemum noctiflorum L.
- Mesembryanthemum nodiflorum L.
- Mesembryanthemum nucifer (Ihlenf. & Bittrich) Klak
- Mesembryanthemum occidentale Klak
- Mesembryanthemum oculatum N.E.Br.
- Mesembryanthemum oubergense (L.Bolus) Klak
- Mesembryanthemum pallens Aiton
- Mesembryanthemum parviflorum Jacq.
- Mesembryanthemum paulum (N.E.Br.) L.Bolus
- Mesembryanthemum pellitum Friedrich
- Mesembryanthemum prasinum (L.Bolus) Klak
- Mesembryanthemum pseudoschlichtianum (S.M.Pierce & Gerbaulet) Klak
- Mesembryanthemum quartziticola Klak
- Mesembryanthemum rabiei (L.Bolus) Klak
- Mesembryanthemum rapaceum Jacq.
- Mesembryanthemum resurgens Kensit
- Mesembryanthemum rhizophorum Klak
- Mesembryanthemum salicornioides Pax
- Mesembryanthemum schenckii Schinz
- Mesembryanthemum schlichtianum Sond.
- Mesembryanthemum serotinum (L.Bolus) Klak
- Mesembryanthemum sinuosum L.Bolus
- Mesembryanthemum sladenianum L.Bolus
- Mesembryanthemum spinuliferum Haw.
- Mesembryanthemum splendens L.
- Mesembryanthemum springbokense Klak
- Mesembryanthemum stenandrum (L.Bolus) L.Bolus
- Mesembryanthemum subnodosum A.Berger
- Mesembryanthemum subtruncatum L.Bolus
- Mesembryanthemum suffruticosum (L.Bolus) Klak
- Mesembryanthemum tenuiflorum Jacq.
- Mesembryanthemum tetragonum Thunb.
- Mesembryanthemum theurkauffii (Maire) Maire
- Mesembryanthemum tomentosum Klak
- Mesembryanthemum tortuosum L.
- Mesembryanthemum trichotomum Thunb.
- Mesembryanthemum vaginatum Lam.
- Mesembryanthemum vanheerdei (L.Bolus) Klak
- Mesembryanthemum vanrensburgii (L.Bolus) Klak
- Mesembryanthemum varians Haw.
- Mesembryanthemum viridiflorum Aiton

== Gallery ==
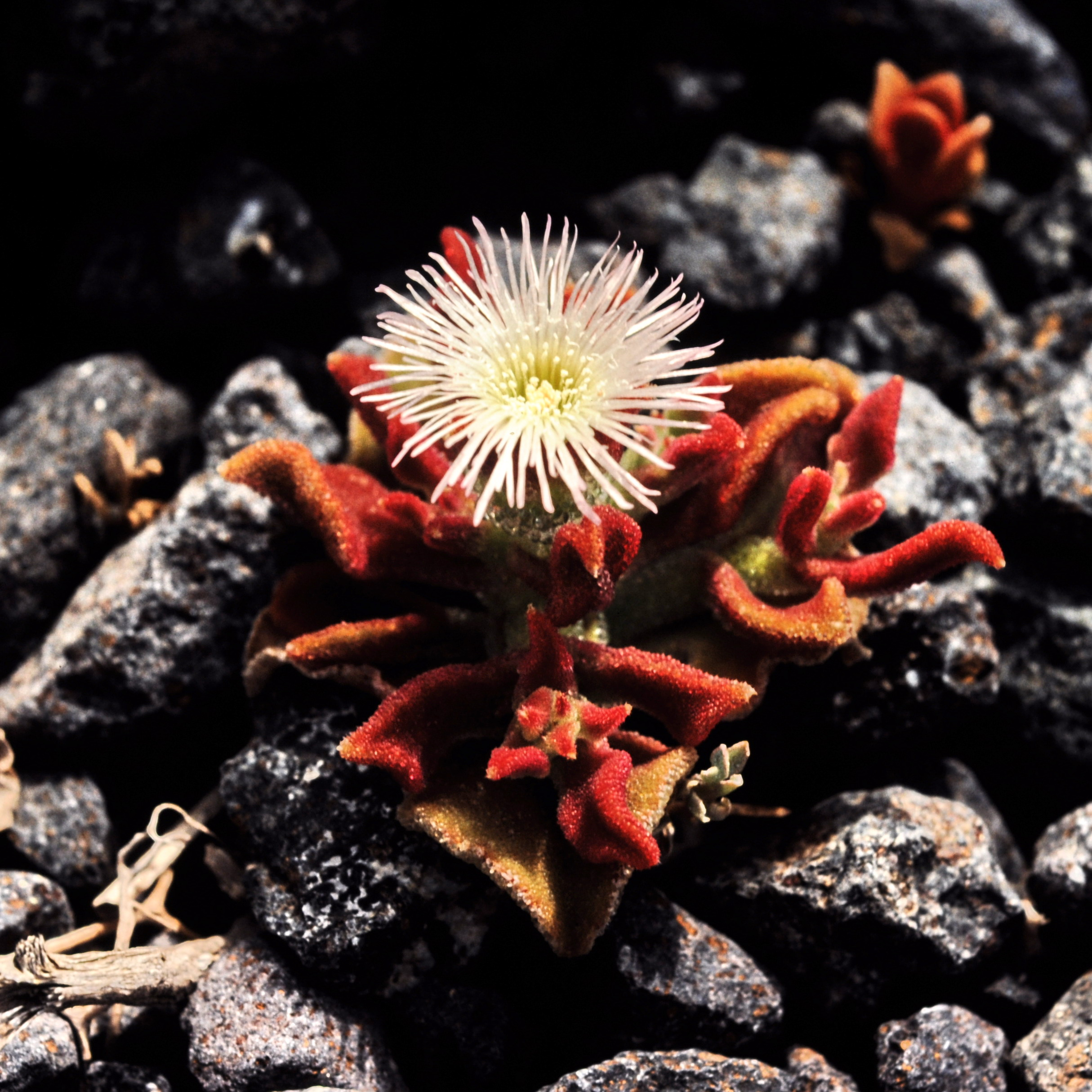
M. crystallinum

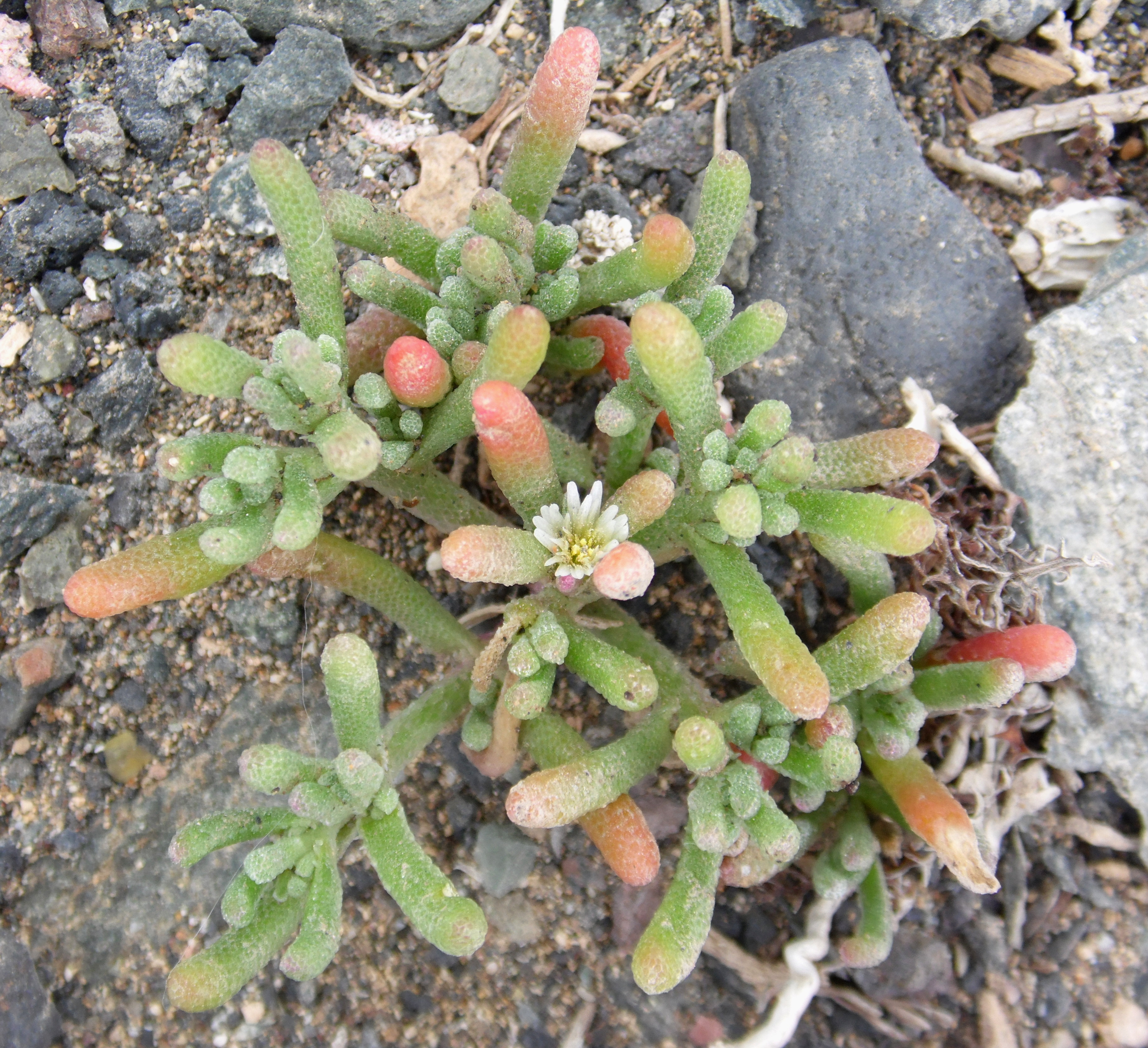
M. nodiflorum

== Legal status ==
=== United States ===
==== Louisiana ====
Except for ornamental purposes, growing, selling or possessing any species of Mesembryanthemum is prohibited by Louisiana State Act 159.

== See also ==
- N. E. Brown
- The botanical family Aizoaceae, also called Mesembryanthemaceae

== Bibliography ==
- Gulliver, George (1864). "Observations on Raphides and other Crystals". The Annals and Magazine of Natural History, Including Zoology, Botany, and Geology. Third Series. 14: 250–252.
