= Middelburg Center for Transatlantic Studies =

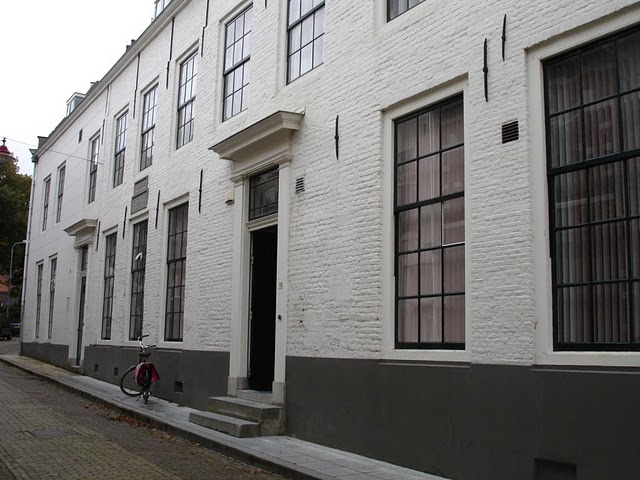
Middelburg Center for Transatlantic Studies

The Middelburg Center for Transatlantic Studies, or MCTS, is based in Middelburg, The Netherlands.

The MCTS brings students and faculty together from both sides of the Atlantic Ocean in the spirit of intercultural understanding and dialogue.

More than 35 universities are members of this unique international network. Students and faculty gather in Middelburg, in the Netherlands, for the purposes of collaboration in research, teaching, and exchange amongst partner institutions in Mexico, the USA, and Europe.

The MCTS offers undergraduates semester-long study abroad programs. Summer sessions are also possible. The MCTS courses focus on a comparative, multidisciplinary approach to transatlantic relationships and developments. Staff and students from consortium institutions gather in a central location to form an interactive, international learning community.

The mission statement of the program:

"The Middelburg Center for Transatlantic Studies seeks to encourage and promote a transatlantic perspective by providing faculty and students with a unique multicultural environment in order to aid their personal, professional, and academic development."

In October 2009, the MCTS moved into its new home in the former Latin School.
