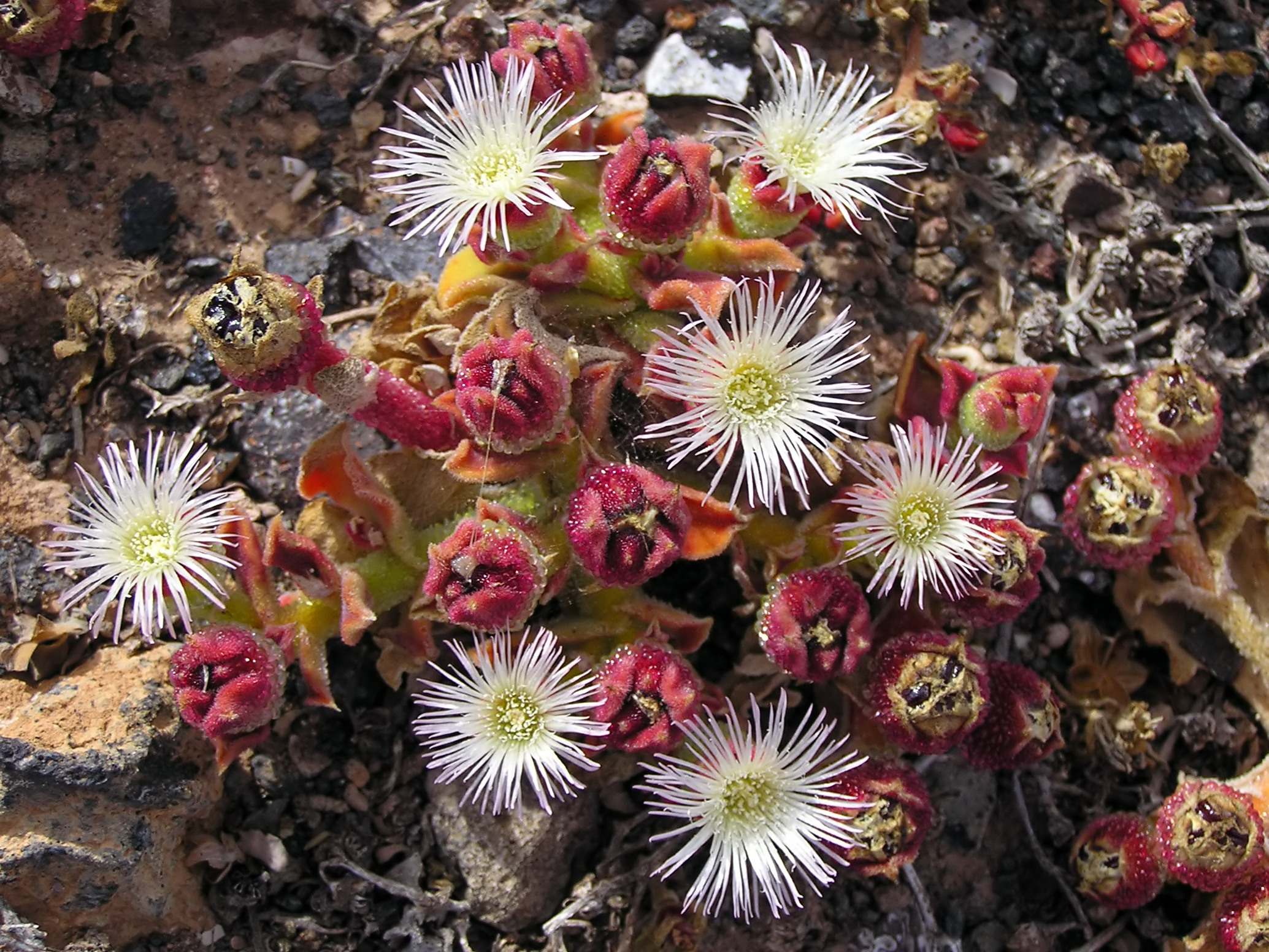
- M. crystallinum flowering in Lanzarote, Canary Islands.

Scientific classification
- Kingdom: Plantae
- Clade: Tracheophytes
- Clade: Angiosperms
- Clade: Eudicots
- Order: Caryophyllales
- Family: Aizoaceae
- Genus: Mesembryanthemum
- Species: M. crystallinum

Binomial name
- Mesembryanthemum crystallinum L.

Synonyms
- Cryophytum crystallinum (L.) N.E.Br.

= Mesembryanthemum crystallinum =

Species of succulent

Mesembryanthemum crystallinum (the common, 'crystalline' or 'crystallinum' iceplant, or simply 'iceplant') is a species of annual/perennial, succulent flowering plant in the Mesembryanthemum genus of the Aizoaceae family.

A true Mediterranean-climate grower, this prostrate groundcover is native to coastal North Africa and Sinai, the Levant and maritime Southern Europe, and several Mediterranean and North Atlantic islands, as well. The plant is covered with large, glistening bladder cells, or water vesicles, hence its many common names such as crystallinum iceplant, crystalline iceplant or iceplant.

== Description ==
Mesembryanthemum crystallinum grows creeping stems, from 20–60 centimetres (8–23 1/2 inches) in length. The leaves are 2–10 cm (3/4–4 in) long. It flowers from March to October. The many-petalled flowers, 2.5 cm (1 in) across, open in the morning and close at night, and are pollinated by insects.

The species is covered with enlarged epidermal cells, called "bladder cells", the main function of which is to reserve water. The plant can be annual, biennial or perennial, but its life cycle is usually completed within several months, depending on environmental conditions.

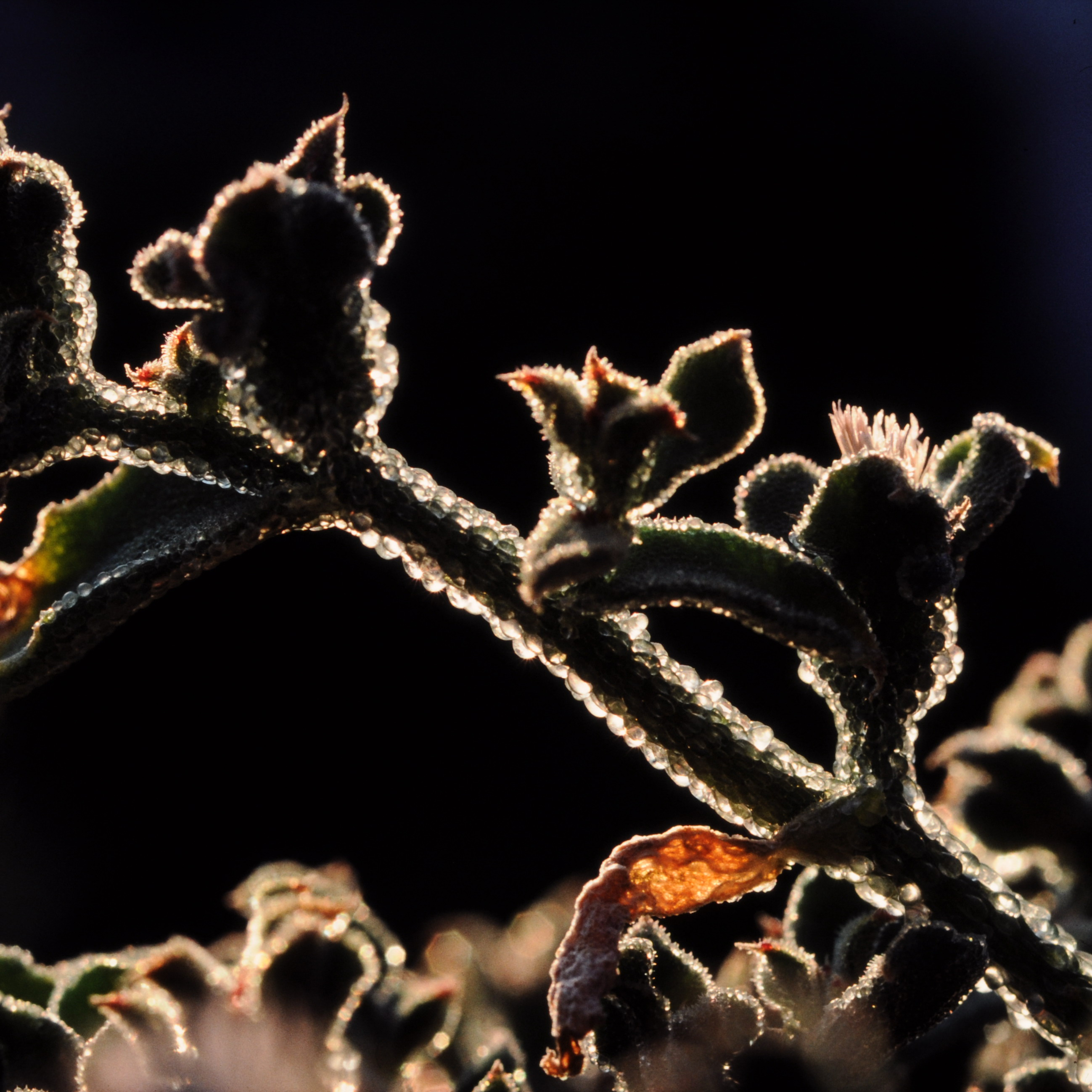
Silhouetted stem

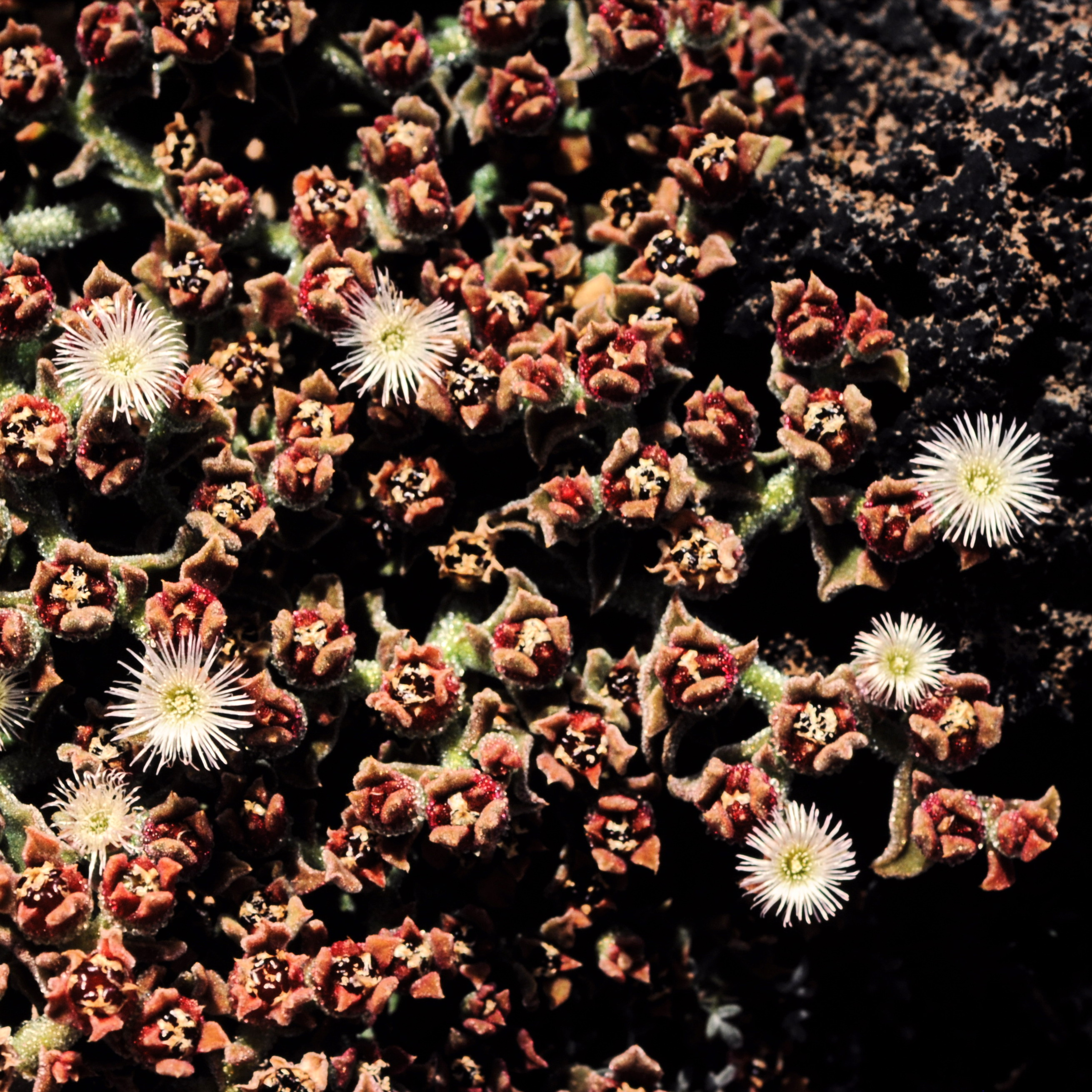
Flowers and leaves

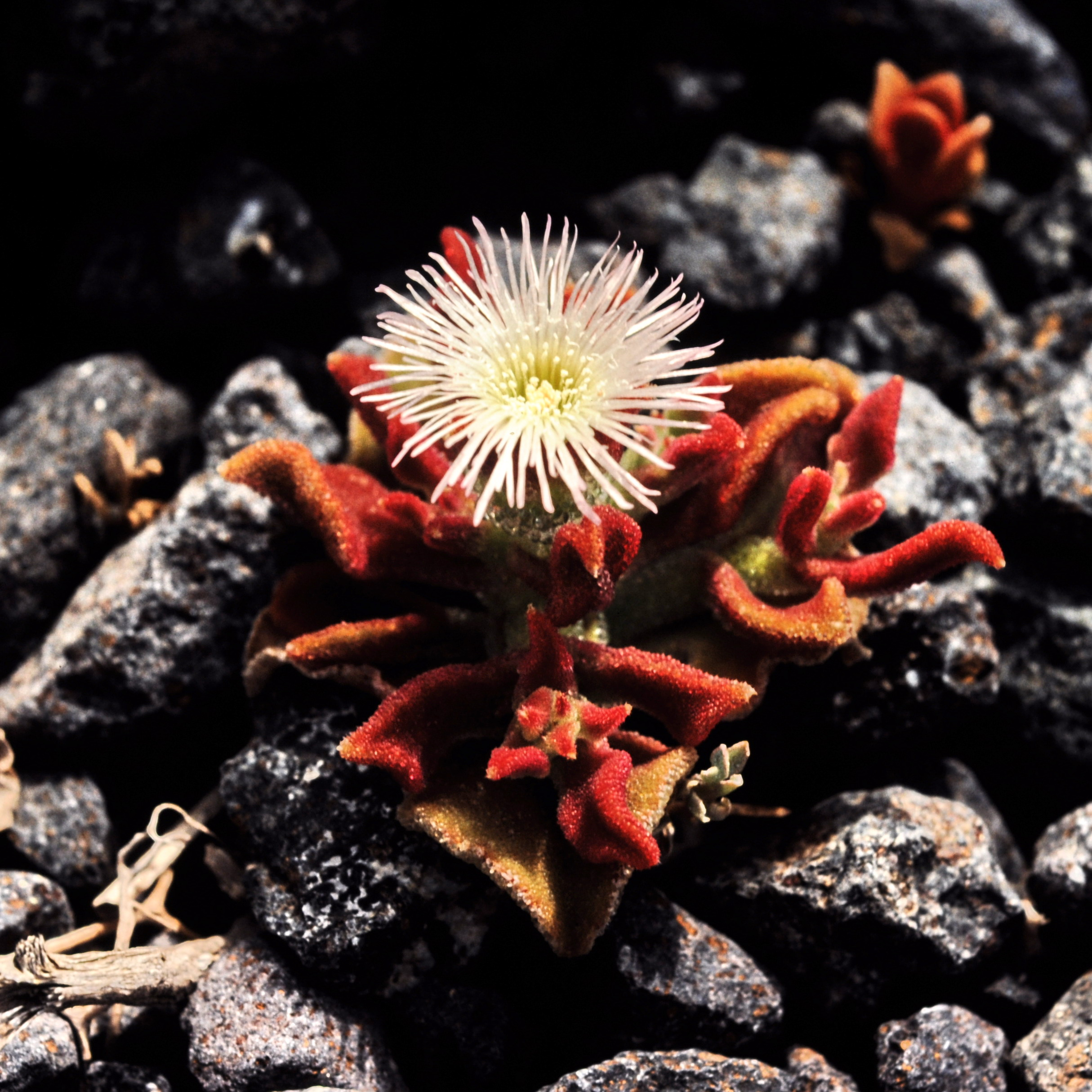
Close-up of flower

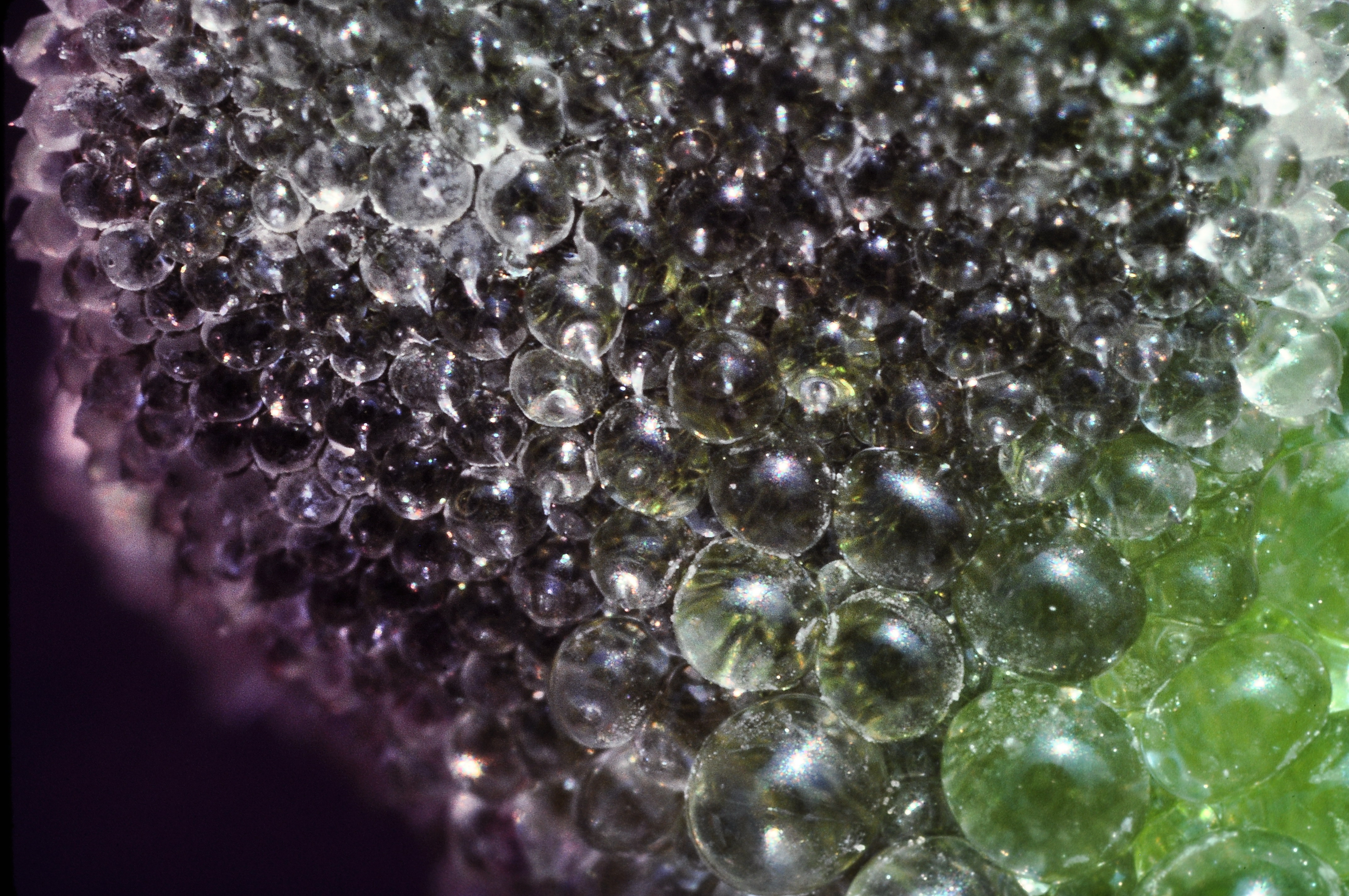
Bladder cells

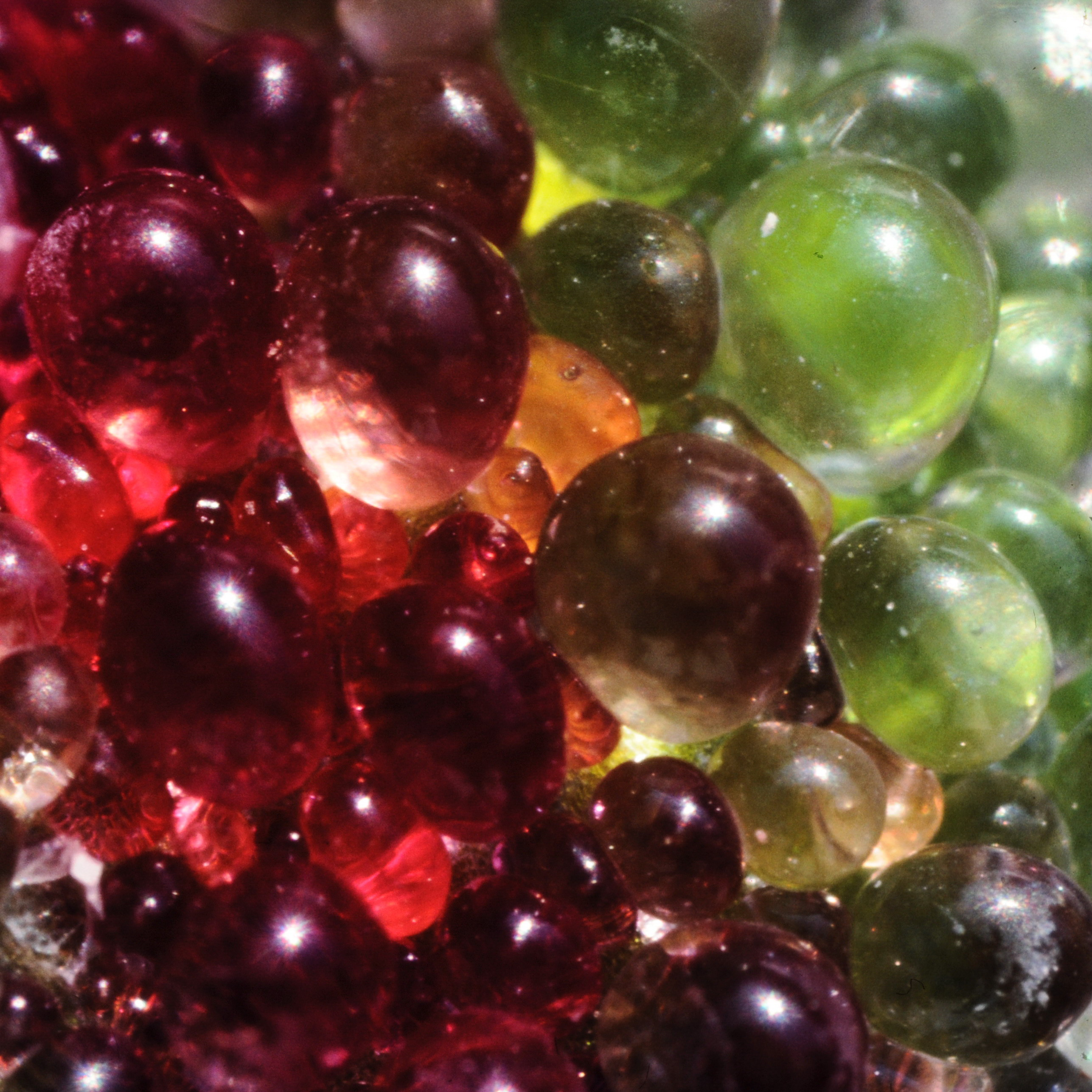
Close-up of bladder cells

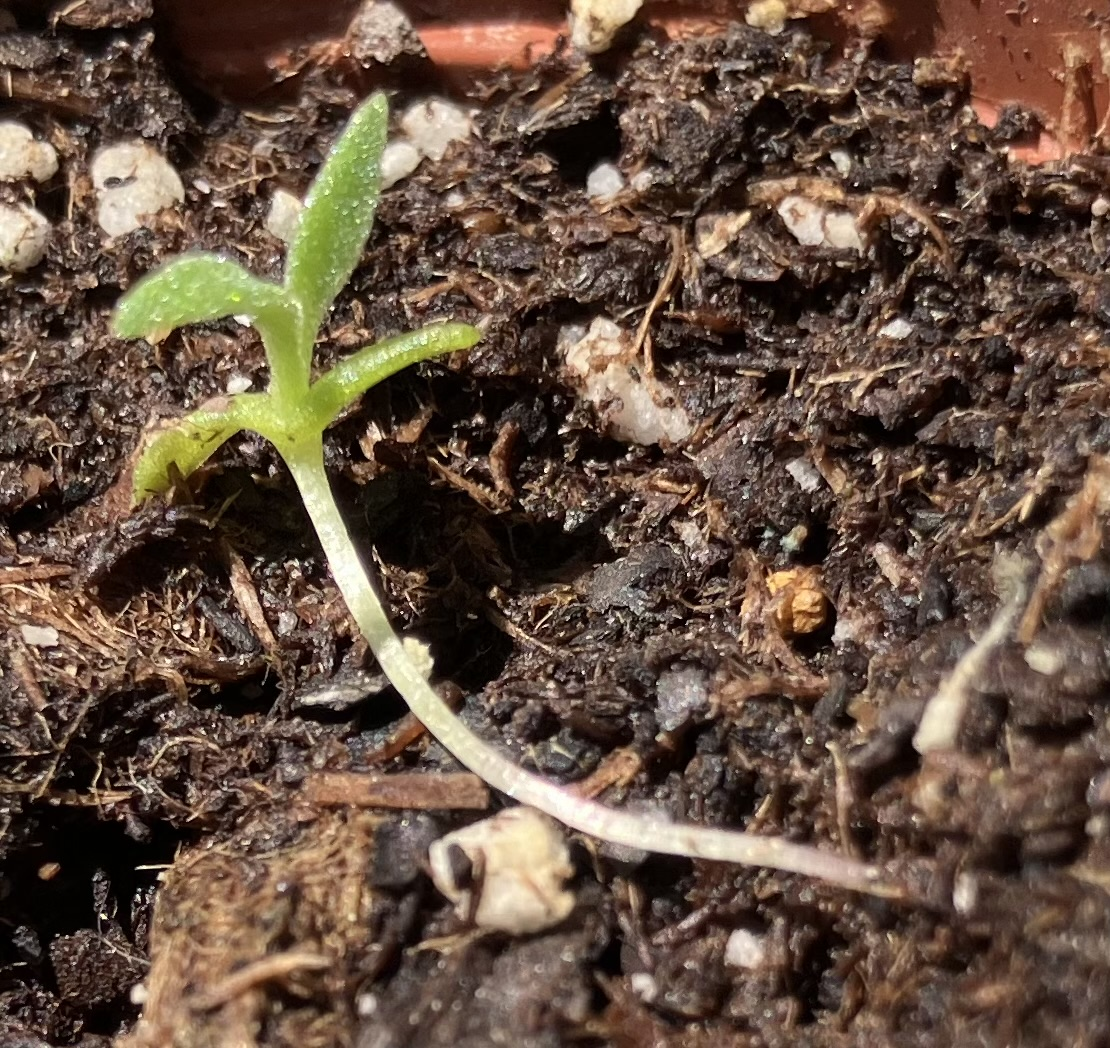
Seedling with cotyledons

=== Biology ===
The plant usually uses C3 carbon fixation, but when it becomes water- or salt-stressed, it is able to switch to Crassulacean acid metabolism. Like many salt-tolerant plants, M. crystallinum accumulates salt throughout its life, in a gradient from the roots to the shoots, with the highest concentration stored in epidermal bladder cells. The salt is released by leaching once the plant dies, resulting in a detrimental osmotic environment preventing the growth of other, non-salt-tolerant species while allowing M. crystallinum seeds to germinate.

In M. crystallinum, the number of seeds produced depends on whether CAM has been activated (C3 metabolism is more efficient) and the size the plant has grown to in its juvenile growth phase. Older portions of the plant progressively die off and dry out during seed production. The developing seed capsules continue to sequester salt and produce viable seeds. Seeds at the top of the capsule generally germinate immediately on imbibation, while seeds at the base may remain dormant for longer than four weeks.

== Distribution and habitat ==
Mesembryanthemum crystallinum is native to Africa, Sinai and southern Europe, and naturalized in the Southwest of North America, as well as in South America and Australia. It is found on a wide range of soil types, from well-drained sandy soils (including sand dunes), to loamy and clay soils. It can tolerate nutritionally poor or saline soils (halophile), and grows well in disturbed sites such as roadsides, rubbish dumps and homestead yards.

== Ecology ==
M. crystallinum is listed as an invasive species in North America, South America, and Australia. Its ability to grow in poor quality or saline soils and preference for disturbed areas are traits shared by many invasive plants which enable them to outcompete native species. In addition salt sequestration over the plant's lifetime, and the subsequent leaching into the soil upon its death, create an environment in which other plant's seeds struggle to germinate, allowing for the colonization of new areas with very little competition.

The plant is rarely, if ever, grazed upon by domestic stock.

== Uses ==
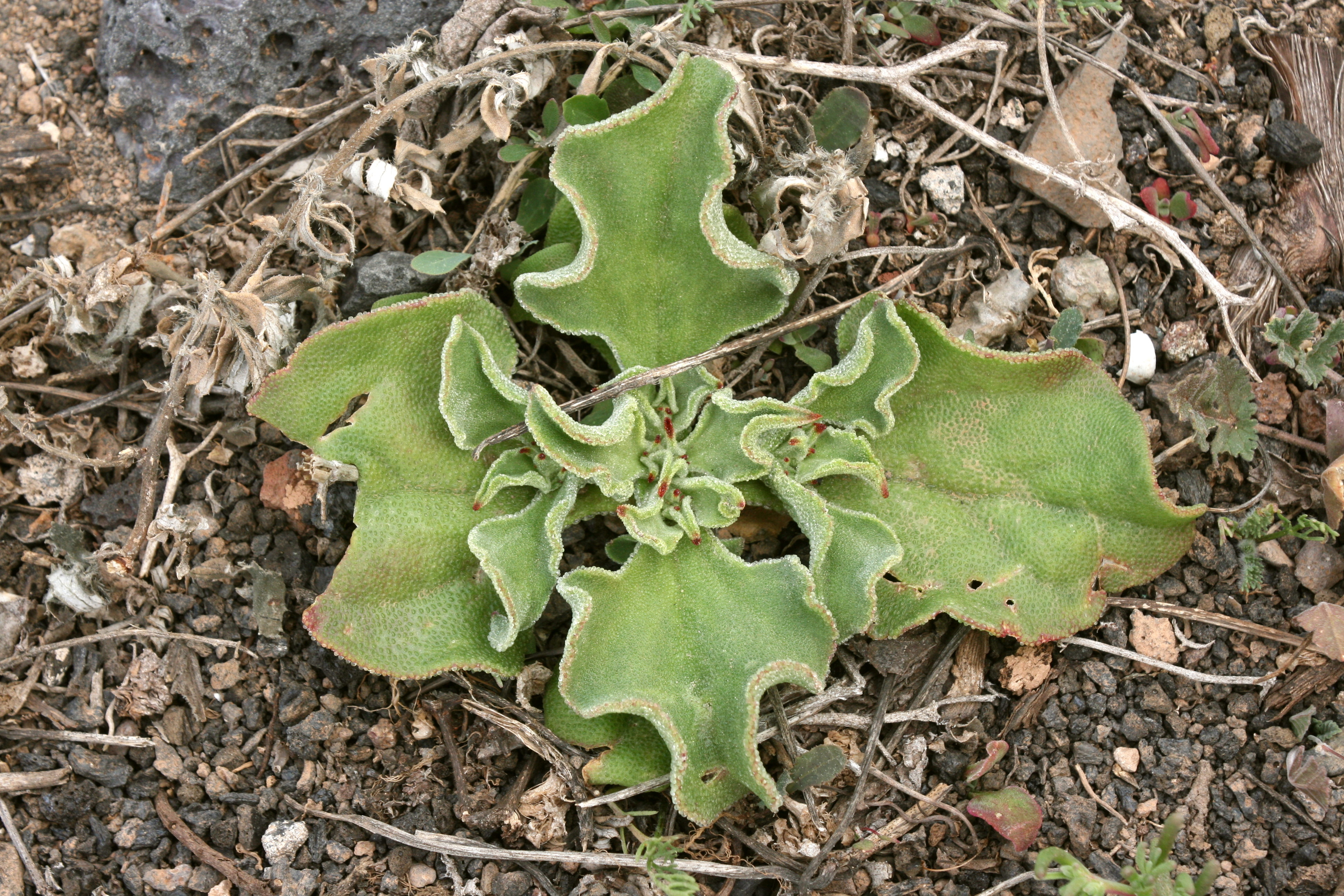
A younger plant in Lanzarote

The leaves are edible, as with some other members of the family Aizoaceae. The plant was once promoted in the United States and Europe as a vegetable similar to spinach, but failed to gain popularity. In southern Africa, the leaves and stems are gathered from the wild and pickled. In Japan, the plant has become a common vegetable sold in supermarkets after Saga University succeeded in hydroponic cultivation of a commercial quantity in 2009; the vegetable goes by the names ice plant (アイスプラント), salt leaf (ソルトリーフ) and barafu (バラフ). The seeds are also edible.

The crushed leaves can be used as a soap substitute and have medicinal uses. Ice plants are also used in South Africa as a way of deterring fires, or "firescaping" gardens. It is also cultivated for ornamentation. Due to its salt accumulation, M. crystallinum may be useful for bioremediation.
