= Mesembranol =

Names
- IUPAC name 3a-(3,4-dimethoxyphenyl)-1-methyl-3,4,5,6,7,7a-hexahydro-2H-indol-6-ol

Identifiers
CAS Number	23544-42-5
3D model (JSmol)	Interactive image
ChemSpider	543700
PubChem CID	625909
- InChI: InChI=1S/C17H25NO3/c1-18-9-8-17(7-6-13(19)11-16(17)18)12-4-5-14(20-2)15(10-12)21-3/h4-5,10,13,16,19H,6-9,11H2,1-3H3 Key: KPMLOZVRLWHOBN-UHFFFAOYSA-N
- SMILES: CN1CC[C@]2([C@@H]1C[C@@H](CC2)O)c3ccc(c(c3)OC)OC

Properties
Chemical formula	C_{17}H_{25}NO_{3}
Molar mass	291.391 g·mol^{−1}
- Except where otherwise noted, data are given for materials in their standard state (at 25 °C [77 °F], 100 kPa). Infobox references

Mesembranol is an alkaloid found in Sceletium tortuosum. Mesembranol is a Serotonin reuptake inhibitor (SRI). It can be consumed orally, smoked, or insufflated. The 3 other main alkaloids found in Sceletium tortuosum are, Mesembrine, Mesembrenone, and Tortuosamine.
