= C17H25NO3 =

The molecular formula C_{17}H_{25}NO_{3} (molar mass: 291.38 g/mol, exact mass: 291.1834 u) may refer to:

- Cyclopentolate
- EA-3834
- Levobunolol
- Mesembranol
- Pecilocin
