= Tortuosamine =

Names
- IUPAC name 2-[(6S)-6-(3,4-Dimethoxyphenyl)-5,6,7,8-tetrahydroquinolin-6-yl]-N-methylethanamine

Identifiers
CAS Number	79517-20-7 (±); 35722-04-4 (R)-(-); 51934-13-5 (S)-(+)
3D model (JSmol)	Interactive image
ChEBI	CHEBI:31030
ChemSpider	391853
KEGG	C12260
PubChem CID	443745
UNII	4C3RW3LZ4X
CompTox Dashboard (EPA)	DTXSID601045659
- InChI: InChI=1S/C20H26N2O2/c1-21-12-10-20(9-8-17-15(14-20)5-4-11-22-17)16-6-7-18(23-2)19(13-16)24-3/h4-7,11,13,21H,8-10,12,14H2,1-3H3/t20-/m1/s1 Key: QFRVOGLOHJOHAY-HXUWFJFHSA-N
- SMILES: CNCC[C@@]1(CCC2=C(C1)C=CC=N2)C3=CC(=C(C=C3)OC)OC

Properties
Chemical formula	C_{20}H_{26}N_{2}O_{2}
Molar mass	326.440 g·mol^{−1}
- Except where otherwise noted, data are given for materials in their standard state (at 25 °C [77 °F], 100 kPa). Infobox references

Tortuosamine is a serotonin reuptake inhibitor (SRI) and alkaloid found in Sceletium tortuosum. It is consumed either orally, smoked, or snorted. The 3 other main alkaloids found in Sceletium tortuosum are, Mesembrine, Mesembrenone, and Mesembranol.
