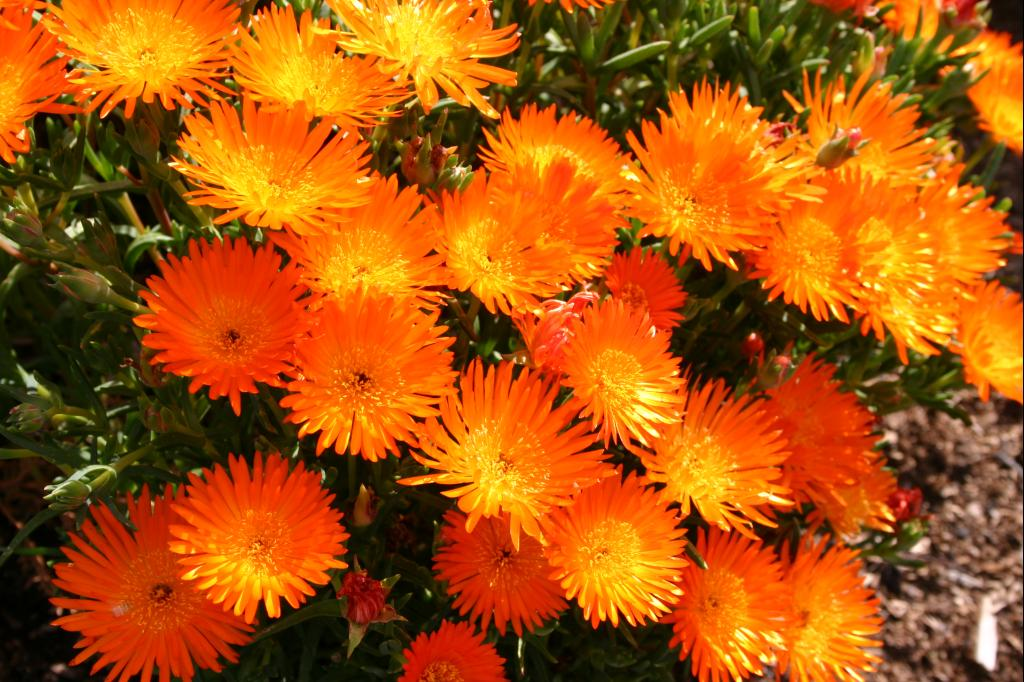

Scientific classification
- Kingdom: Plantae
- Clade: Tracheophytes
- Clade: Angiosperms
- Clade: Eudicots
- Order: Caryophyllales
- Family: Aizoaceae
- Genus: Lampranthus
- Species: L. aureus

Binomial name
- Lampranthus aureus (L.) N.E.Br.

Synonyms
- Mesembryanthemum aureum

= Lampranthus aureus =

Species of plant

Lampranthus aureus is a species of shrub in the family Aizoaceae (stone plants). They are succulent plants. They have a self-supporting growth form and simple, broad leaves.

== Phytochemistry ==
L. aureus contains mesembrenol and low levels of related alkaloids such as mesembrenone and have sometimes been mismarketed as Kanna (Sceletium tortuosum) extract which contains higher levels of related alkaloids.

== Sources ==
This article incorporates text from a free content work. Licensed under CC0 (license statement/permission). Text taken from Lampranthus aureus. Encyclopedia of Life.
