= Mesembrenone =

Chemical compound

Names
- Preferred IUPAC name (3aR,7aS)-3a-(3,4-Dimethoxyphenyl)-1-methyl-1,2,3,3a,7,7a-hexahydro-6H-indol-6-one

Identifiers
CAS Number	468-54-2
3D model (JSmol)	Interactive image
ChemSpider	187467
PubChem CID	216272
UNII	HT8JNS8E79
CompTox Dashboard (EPA)	DTXSID60963667
- InChI: InChI=1S/C17H21NO3/c1-18-9-8-17(7-6-13(19)11-16(17)18)12-4-5-14(20-2)15(10-12)21-3/h4-7,10,16H,8-9,11H2,1-3H3/t16-,17-/m0/s1 Key: HDNHBCSWFYFPAN-IRXDYDNUSA-N
- SMILES: O=C3\C=C/[C@]2(c1ccc(OC)c(OC)c1)[C@@H](N(CC2)C)C3

Properties
Chemical formula	C_{17}H_{21}NO_{3}
Molar mass	287.359 g·mol^{−1}
- Except where otherwise noted, data are given for materials in their standard state (at 25 °C [77 °F], 100 kPa). Infobox references

Mesembrenone is an alkaloid found in Sceletium tortuosum (Kanna) and minor constituent of Lampranthus aureus and Lampranthus spectabilis. It can be consumed orally, smoked, or snorted.

It is a potent (IC_{50} < 1 μM) selective inhibitor of the serotonin transporter (SERT) (that is, a serotonin reuptake inhibitor; K_{i} = 27 nM) and also a phosphodiesterase 4 (PDE4) inhibitor (K_{i} = 470 nM).

== See also ==
Other alkaloids present in Kanna include:

- Mesembrine
- Mesembranol
- Tortuosamine
