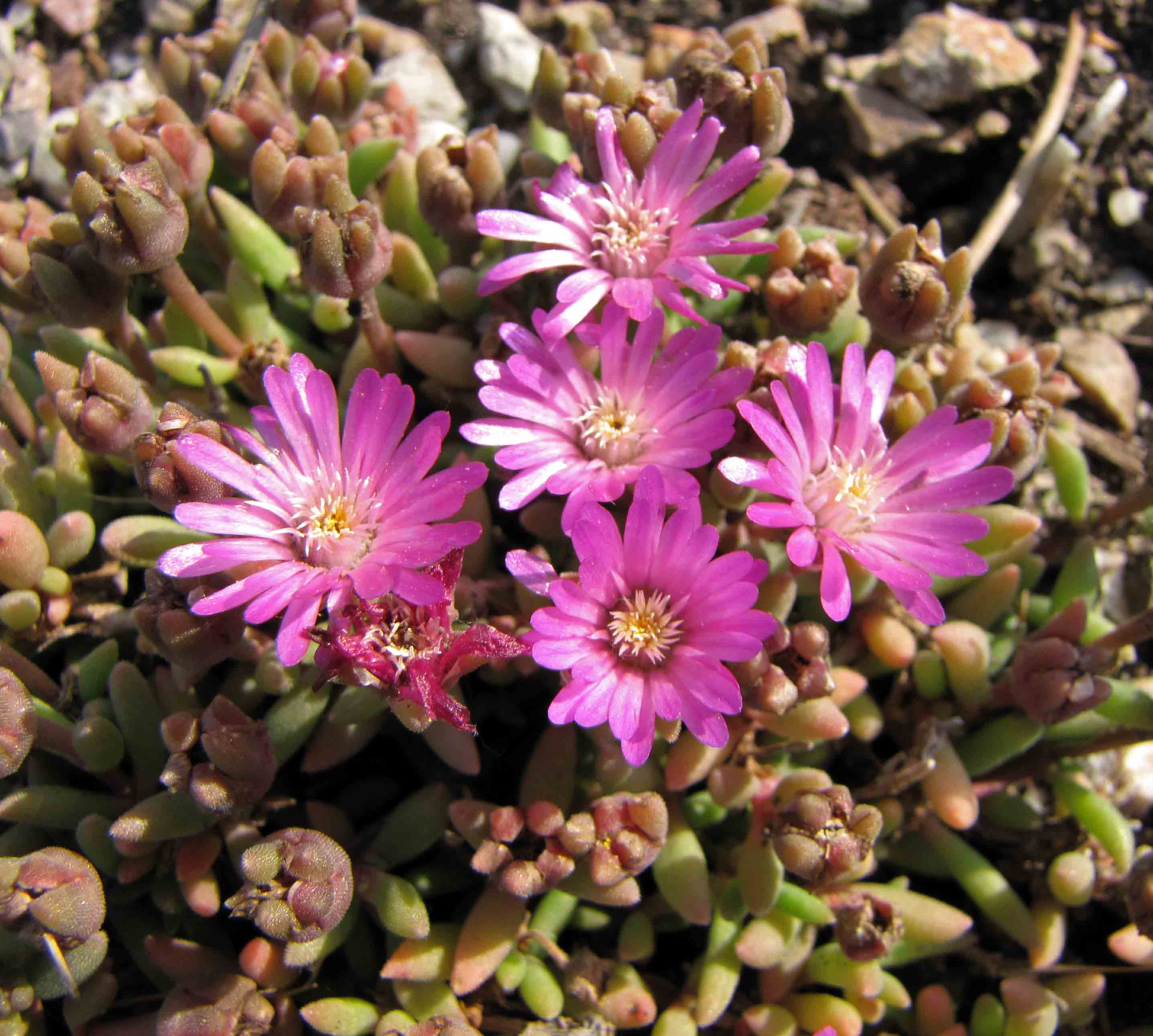
- At the Botanical Garden of the University of Vienna

Scientific classification
- Kingdom: Plantae
- Clade: Embryophytes
- Clade: Tracheophytes
- Clade: Angiosperms
- Clade: Eudicots
- Order: Caryophyllales
- Family: Aizoaceae
- Genus: Delosperma
- Species: D. aberdeenense

Binomial name
- Delosperma aberdeenense (L.Bolus) L.Bolus

Synonyms
- Mesembryanthemum aberdeenense L.Bolus

= Delosperma aberdeenense =

Species of flowering plant

Delosperma aberdeenense, called the Aberdeen dew plant, is a species of flowering plant in the ice plant family Aizoaceae, native to the Cape Provinces of South Africa. It has gained the Royal Horticultural Society's Award of Garden Merit.
