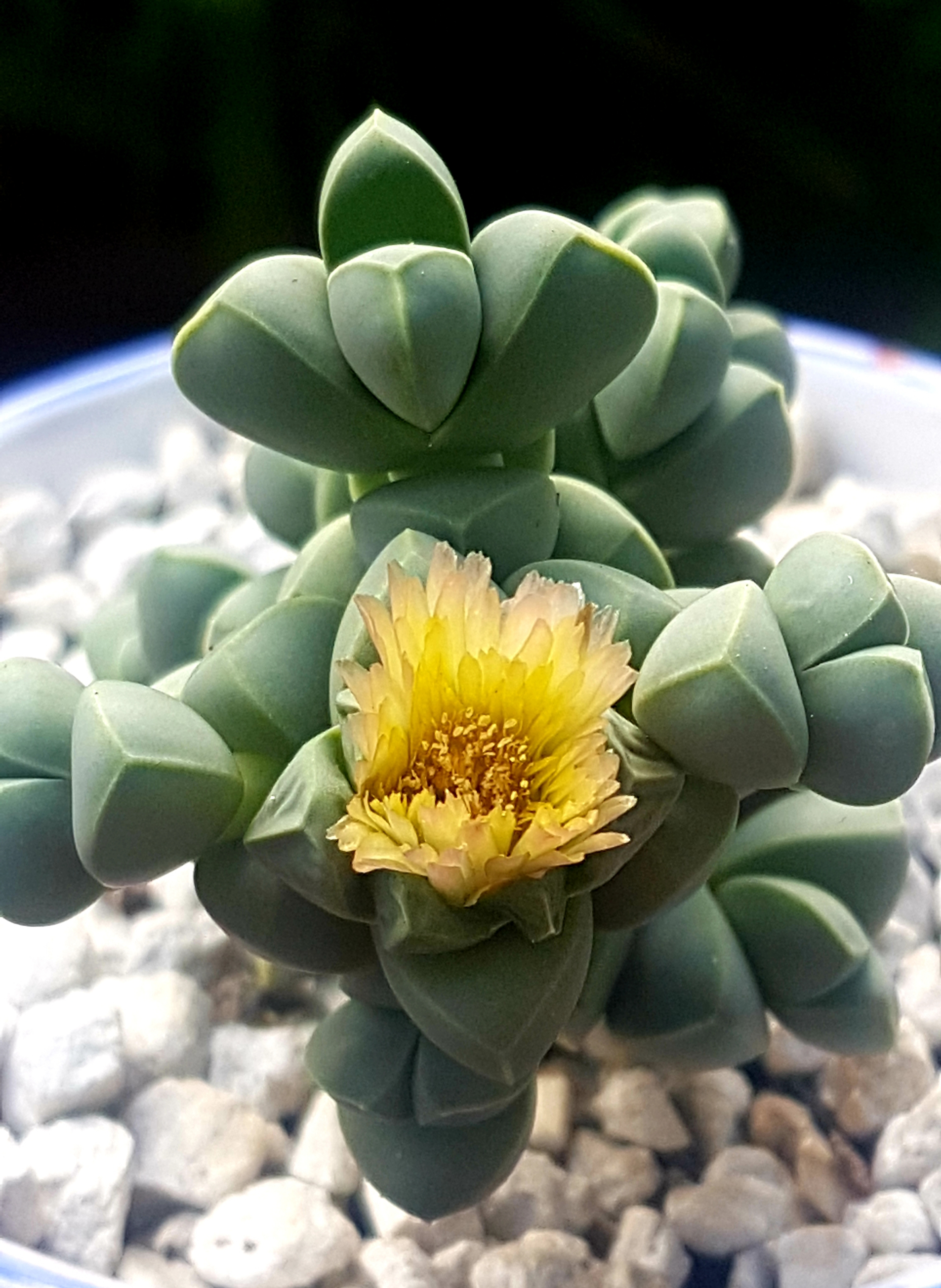
- In flower

Conservation status
- Critically endangered (SANBI Red List)

Scientific classification
- Kingdom: Plantae
- Clade: Tracheophytes
- Clade: Angiosperms
- Clade: Eudicots
- Order: Caryophyllales
- Family: Aizoaceae
- Genus: Delosperma
- Species: D. lehmannii

Binomial name
- Delosperma lehmannii Eckl. & Zeyh.

Synonyms
- Corpuscularia lehmannii Schwantes Mesembryanthemum lehmannii Eckl. & Zeyh. Mesembryanthemum sexpartitum N.E.Br. Schonlandia lehmannii (Eckl. & Zeyh.) L.Bolus

= Delosperma lehmannii =

Species of plant

Delosperma lehmannii is a succulent plant native to parts of the Eastern Cape Province of South Africa. Sometimes called ice plant, it is grown as a decorative houseplant for its distinctive smooth, angular leaves. The specific epithet lehmannii honors the German professor of botany in Hamburg Johann Georg Christian Lehmann.

Delosperma lehmannii grows in the eastern coastal strip of the Cape Peninsula over an area of about 70 km^{2} between Coega and Port Elizabeth.

It grows on quartz soils in the Karoo. It tolerates aridity well and temperatures down to -5 °. Densely leafy, it forms a cushion with a tap root and some additional adventitious roots on sprawling, prostrate stems.

Although it has not yet been subjected to an evaluation by the IUCN, the South African National Biodiversity Institute (SANBI) has classified it as a species at extremely high risk of extinction in the wild. In 2006, of the six registered populations, four were extinct due to the urban expansion of Port Elizabeth; in one of the remaining sub-populations near Coega over 60% of the habitat had been lost to mining.

== Description ==
Delosperma lehmannii is a compact plant with glaucous leaves with a characteristic triangular section.

It has numerous short, decombing shoots. All parts are hairless. The leaves are forked, at 3 angles. Leaves on shoots up to 4 cm long (mostly 20–25 mm long) and 8–10 mm wide and spaced apart. The flowers are approximately 4 cm in diameter. Six sepals. Translucent white to straw-colored petals, decreasing in length towards the center. Capsules: 6-8 chambers. Seeds: 0.9–1 mm in length, 0.6–0.75 mm wide.
