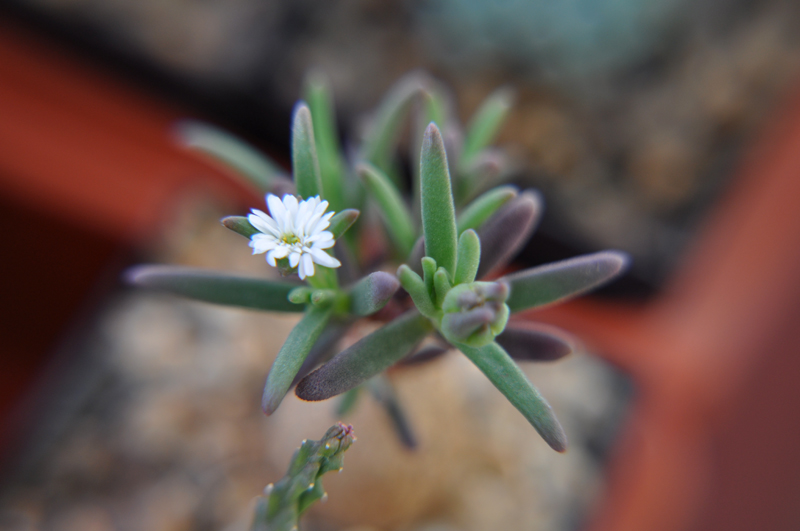

Scientific classification
- Kingdom: Plantae
- Clade: Tracheophytes
- Clade: Angiosperms
- Clade: Eudicots
- Order: Caryophyllales
- Family: Aizoaceae
- Genus: Delosperma
- Species: D. napiforme

Binomial name
- Delosperma napiforme (N.E.Br.) Schwantes

= Delosperma napiforme =

Species of plant

Delosperma napiforme (also known as Mestoklema macrorrhizum) is a dwarf perennial plant, native to the French island of Réunion, but also now found in Madagascar. It has white flowers

== Cultivation and uses ==
It can be cultivated in a wide range of areas with a Mediterranean climate such as California. It can withstand wet summers and cold moist winters which makes it unusual in climatic requirements for this genus.
