= SNTX-2643 =

Clinical data
- Other names: SNTX2643; SENS-01; SENS01
- Routes of administration: Oral
- Drug class: Atypical serotonin reuptake inhibitor
- ATC code: None

Pharmacokinetic data
- Onset of action: Rapid; Peak: 1.5–2.0 hours
- Elimination half-life: 3.9–5.7 hours
- Duration of action: ≥24 hours

SNTX-2643, formerly known as SENS-01, is an atypical serotonin reuptake inhibitor (SRI) derived from Sceletium tortuosum (kanna). It is under development for the treatment of social anxiety disorder, as well as other anxiety disorders and depressive disorders. It is described as a novel/first-in-class and fast-acting anxiolytic with less sedation. The drug is administered orally.

== Side effects ==
Side effects of SNTX-2643 include nausea, vomiting, headache, dizziness, and hypotension. No indications of sedation, dissociation, or misuse-related side effects were observed.

== Pharmacology ==
=== Pharmacodynamics ===
SNTX-2643 acts as a selective atypical serotonin reuptake inhibitor (SRI). Specifically, it binds to an allosteric site on the serotonin transporter (SERT), rather than to the orthosteric site targeted by serotonin and classical selective serotonin reuptake inhibitors (SSRIs). In addition, SNTX-2643 stabilizes the SERT in an inward-open conformation, as opposed to the outward-open conformation of SSRIs. It also acts in an uncompetitive fashion, in contrast to SSRIs. Among the only other known SRIs to stabilize the SERT in the inward-open conformation include ibogaine and noribogaine, as well as novel lesser-known compounds like ZINC000443438219.

Sceletium tortuosum (kanna) acts similarly to SNTX-2643 via its primary alkaloid constituent, mesembrine, but SNTX-2643 is a synthetic derivative with improved drug-like properties. Unlike SSRIs, which typically require 4 to 6 weeks of administration to achieve therapeutic benefits, kanna is reported to have a rapid calming effect within 30 to 60 minutes of ingestion. The precise mechanism underlying these differences remains unclear, but appears to involve distinct downstream kinase-mediated signaling pathways.

SNTX-2643 has been found to produce a measurable electroencephalogram (EEG) response in humans and to blunt EEG and autonomic changes induced by a psychological stressor in humans. These effects were present at both 2 hours and 24 hours post-dose.

=== Pharmacokinetics ===
The median time to peak levels of SNTX-2643 is 1.5 to 2.0 hours and its median elimination half-life is 3.9 to 5.7 hours.

== Chemistry ==
The chemical structure of SNTX-2643 has not yet been publicly disclosed. However, mesembrine analogues acting on the serotonin transporter (SERT) with enhanced drug-like properties were patented by Sensorium Therapeutics in 2025.

== Development ==
SNTX-2643 is being developed by Sensorium Therapeutics. As of August 2025, it is undergoing phase 1 clinical trials. Although listed on Psychedelic Alpha's drug development tracker, SNTX-2643 is not itself a psychedelic. Its inclusion reflects its action on the serotonin system rather than any psychedelic effects. Phase 1 findings were released in September 2026.

== See also ==
- List of investigational hallucinogens and entactogens
- List of investigational social anxiety disorder drugs
- List of investigational anxiolytics
- List of investigational antidepressants
- Sceletium tortuosum (kanna) and mesembrine
- KH-001
