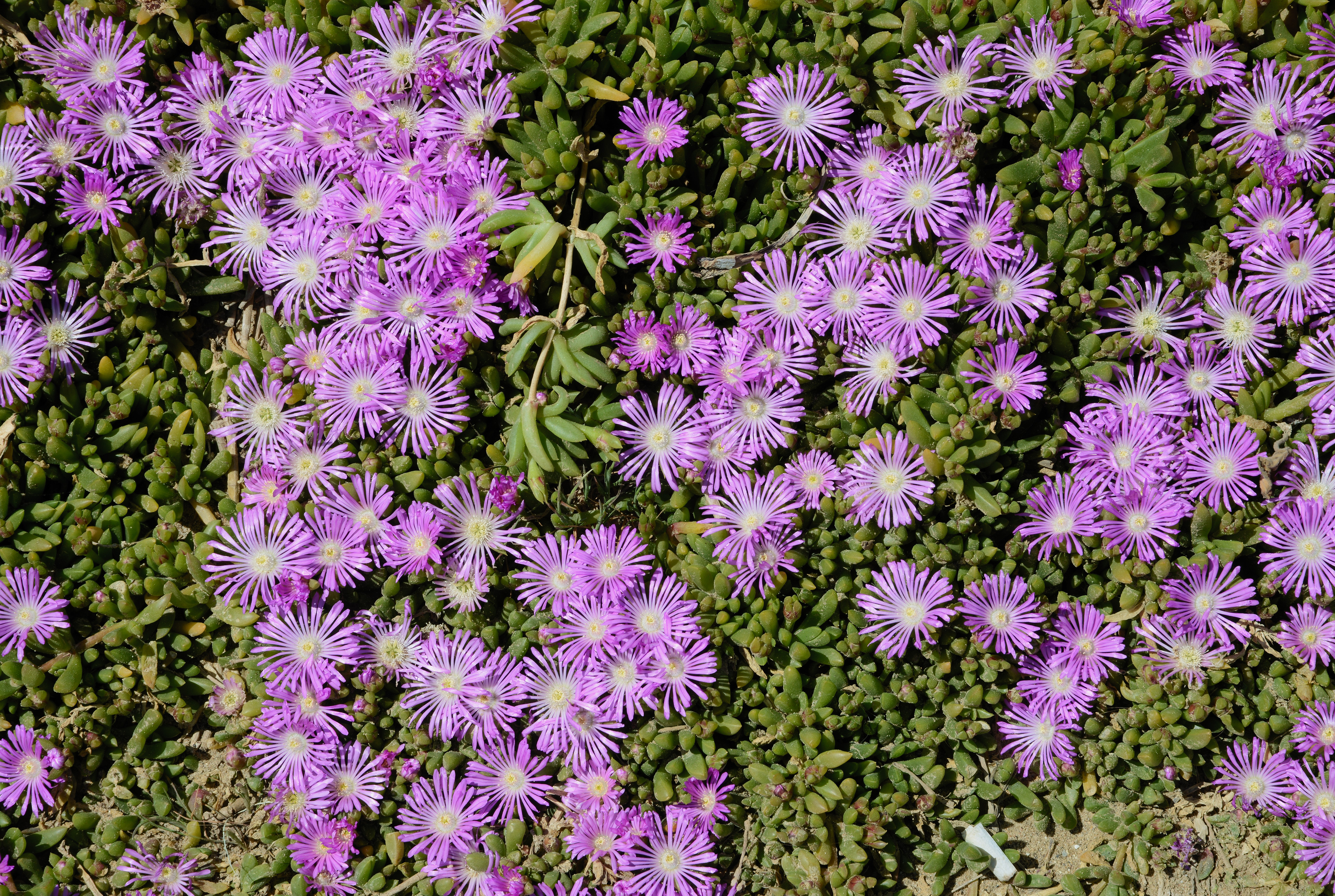

Scientific classification
- Kingdom: Plantae
- Clade: Embryophytes
- Clade: Tracheophytes
- Clade: Spermatophytes
- Clade: Angiosperms
- Clade: Eudicots
- Order: Caryophyllales
- Family: Aizoaceae
- Genus: Delosperma
- Species: D. cooperi

Binomial name
- Delosperma cooperi (Hook.f.) L.Bolus

Synonyms
- Mesembryanthemum cooperi Hook.f.

= Delosperma cooperi =

Species of plant

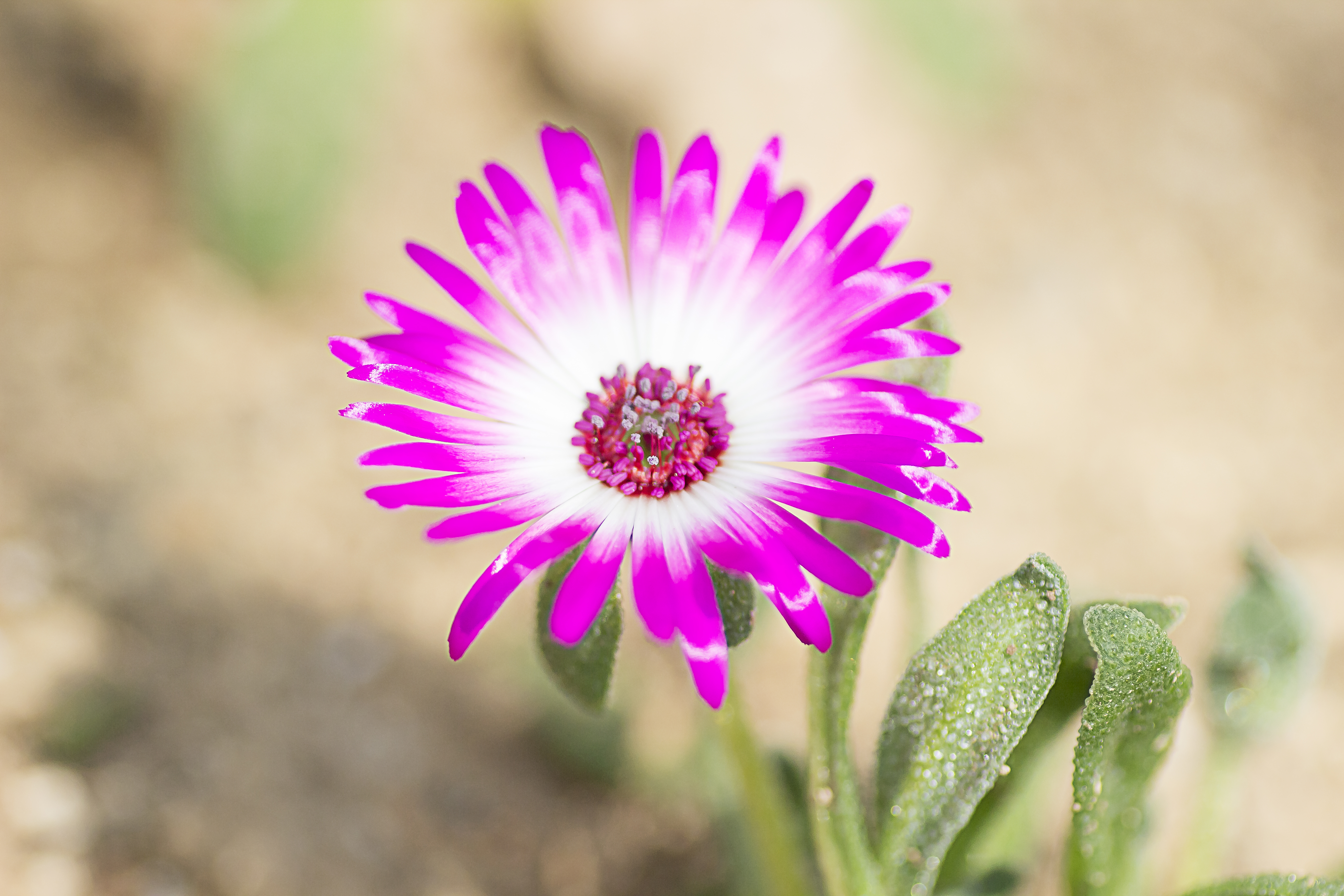
Bicolored hybrid

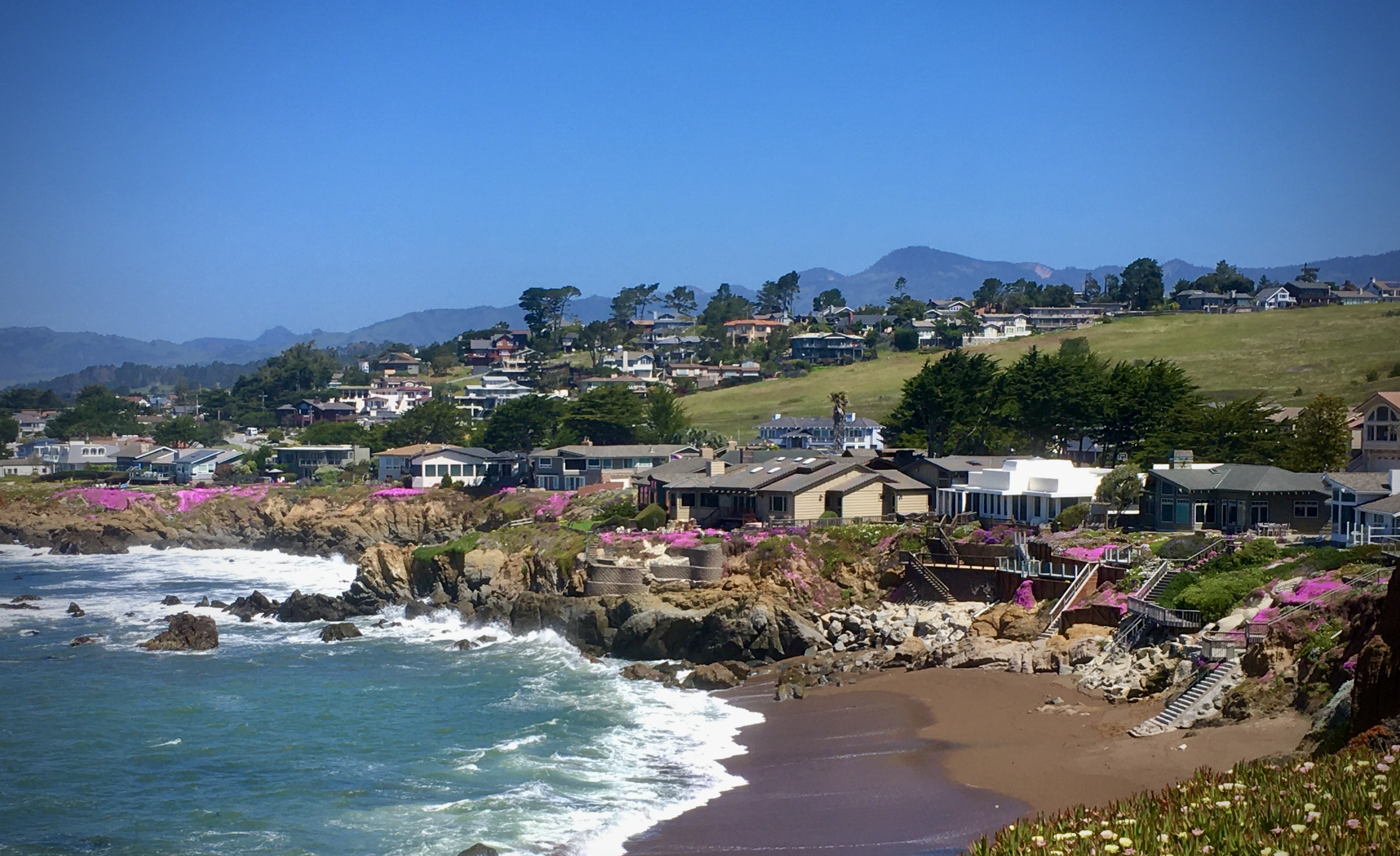
Plantings in oceanfront gardens, Cambria, California, April 2020

Delosperma cooperi (syn. Mesembryanthemum cooperi), the trailing iceplant, hardy iceplant or pink carpet, is a dwarf perennial plant native to South Africa. It forms a dense lawn with abundant, long-lasting flowers. It reaches sizes of approximately 10–15 cm (4–6 in) tall, with fleshy leaves that are linear and simple and can grow up to 1.5 inches long and a trailing stem that hangs down. These fleshy roots help provide the ability for the plants to recover and grow rapidly if a disturbance has occurred.

== Description ==
The flowers are the most brilliant aspect of this plant, with the production of a great quantity of vermillion, magenta or pink flowers that often covers the entire site, hence the popular name "pink carpet". The plant contains ramified stems that are spread out, carrying sheets opposed,? and are long and narrow, with the end of the stems increasing into a quantity of isolated small flowers, with diameters ranging from 3 to 5 cm (1 to 2 in). These abundant and long-lasting flowers remains in bloom from June to October. The plant is sun-loving, and thrives in very dry and hot environments. While it adapts well to various soil types, it will suffer under water stagnation, and thus prefers well drained soils, or even rocky terrain. University of Arkansas Research and Extension states these native habitat lack in competition with grasses, so as a result are mostly found in dry, salt-tolerant, rocky sites.

According to the New Mexico State University extension, the common name, "ice plant" is because "they have bladder-like hairs on the leaf surface that reflect and refract light in a manner to make it appear that they sparkle like ice crystals" (or tiny glass beads). This certainly applies to Mesembryanthemum crystallinum, however, many other species of succulent so-called "ice plant" ground covers have smooth and hairless leaves.

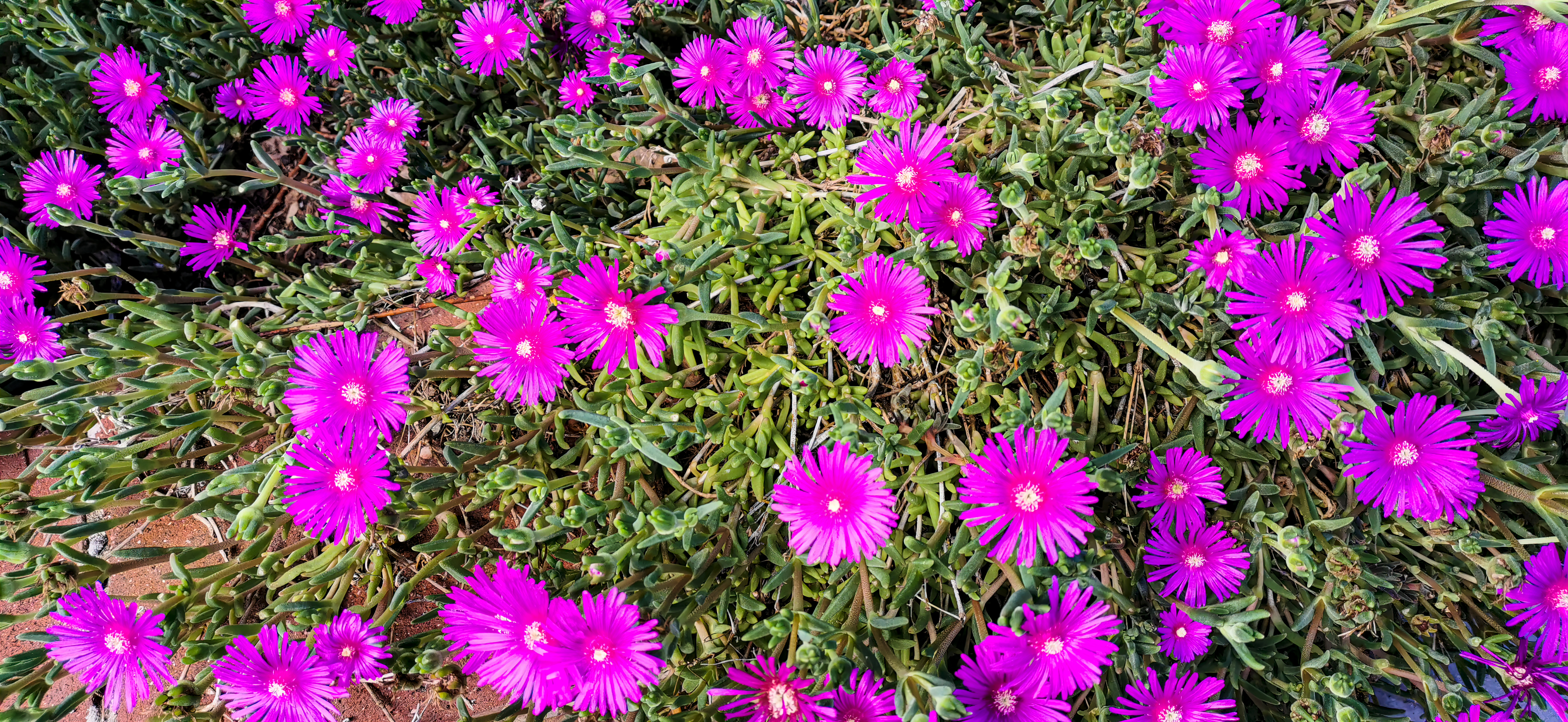
Plant habit

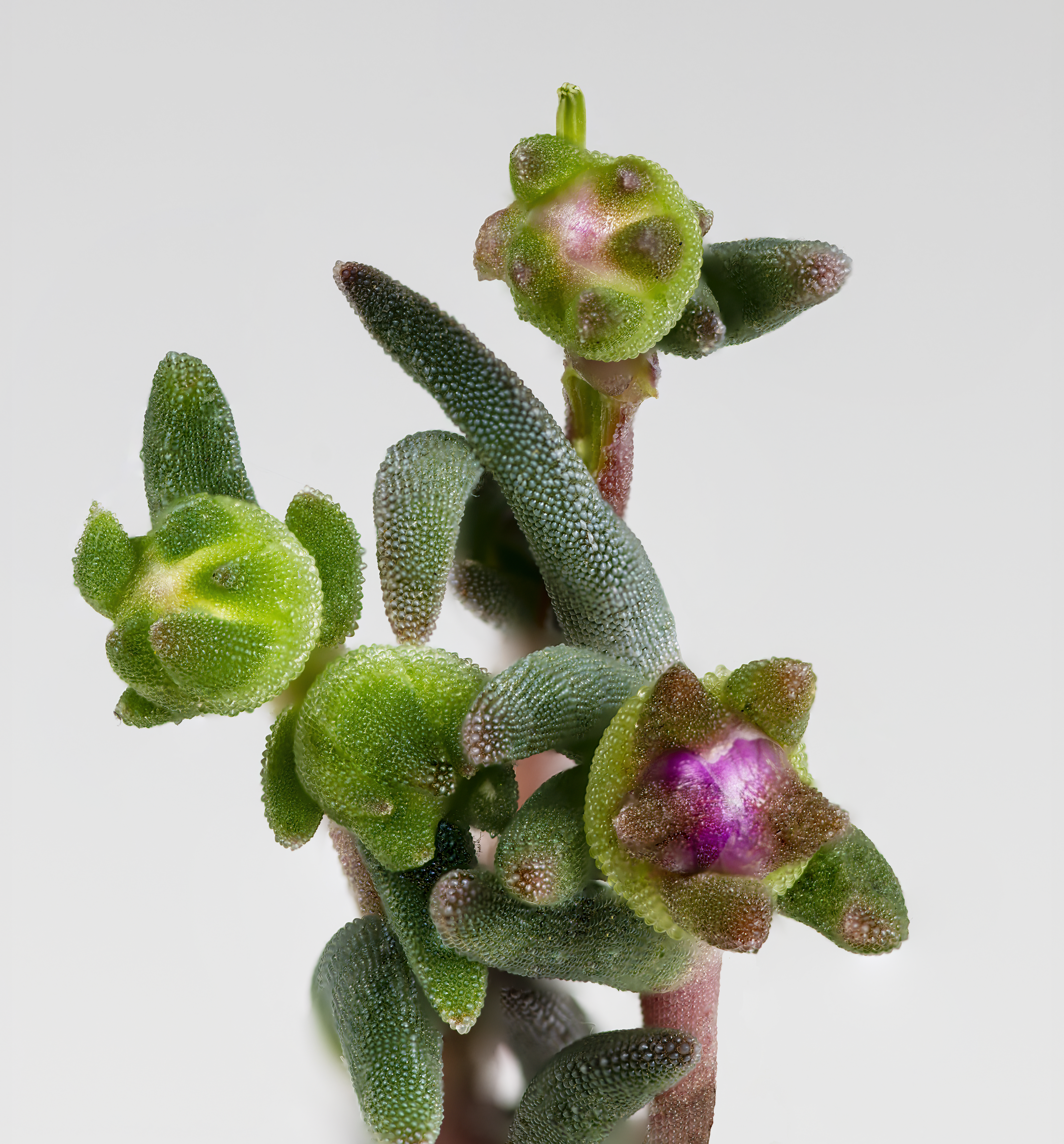
Flower buds

Flower and leaves

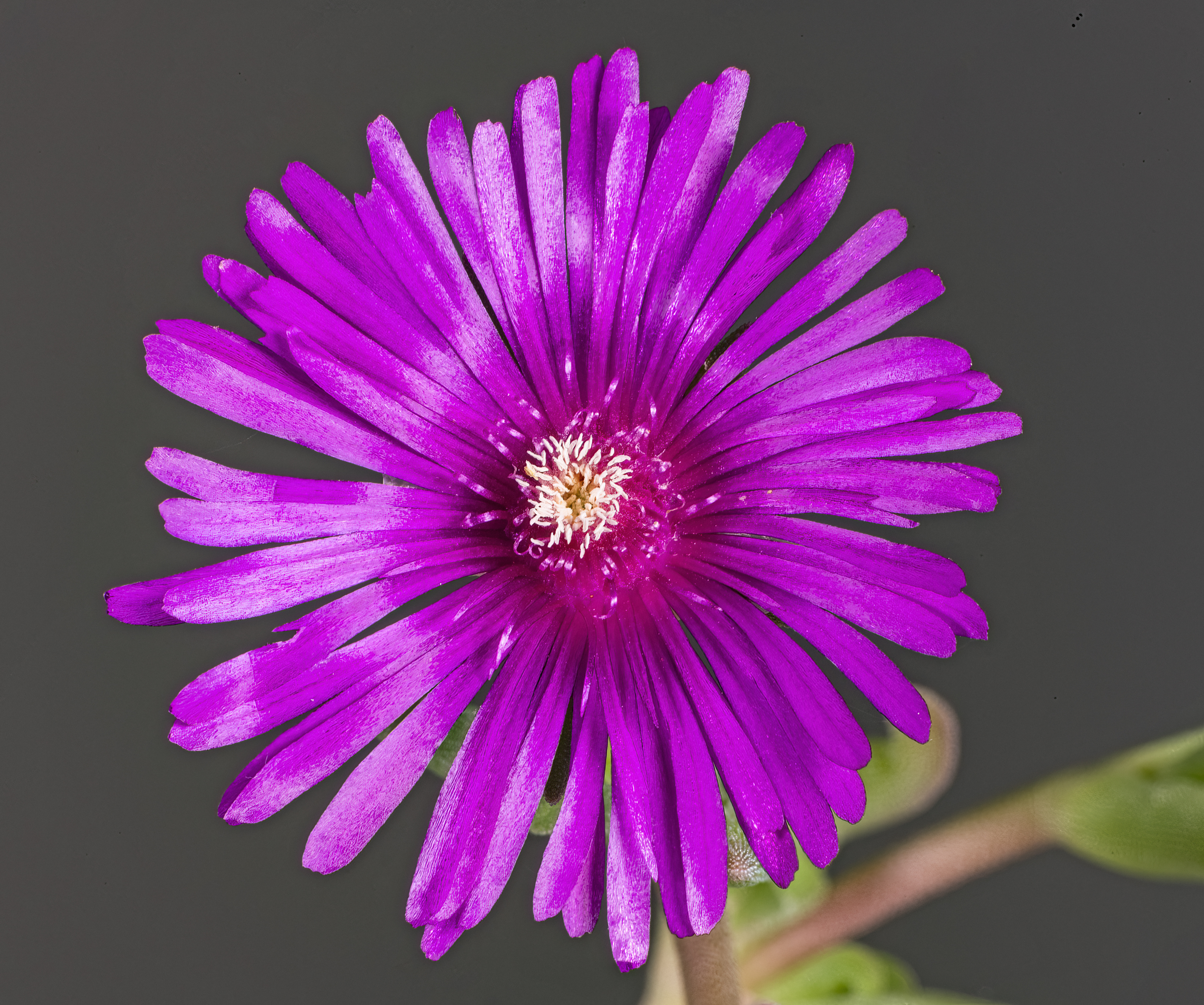
Flower

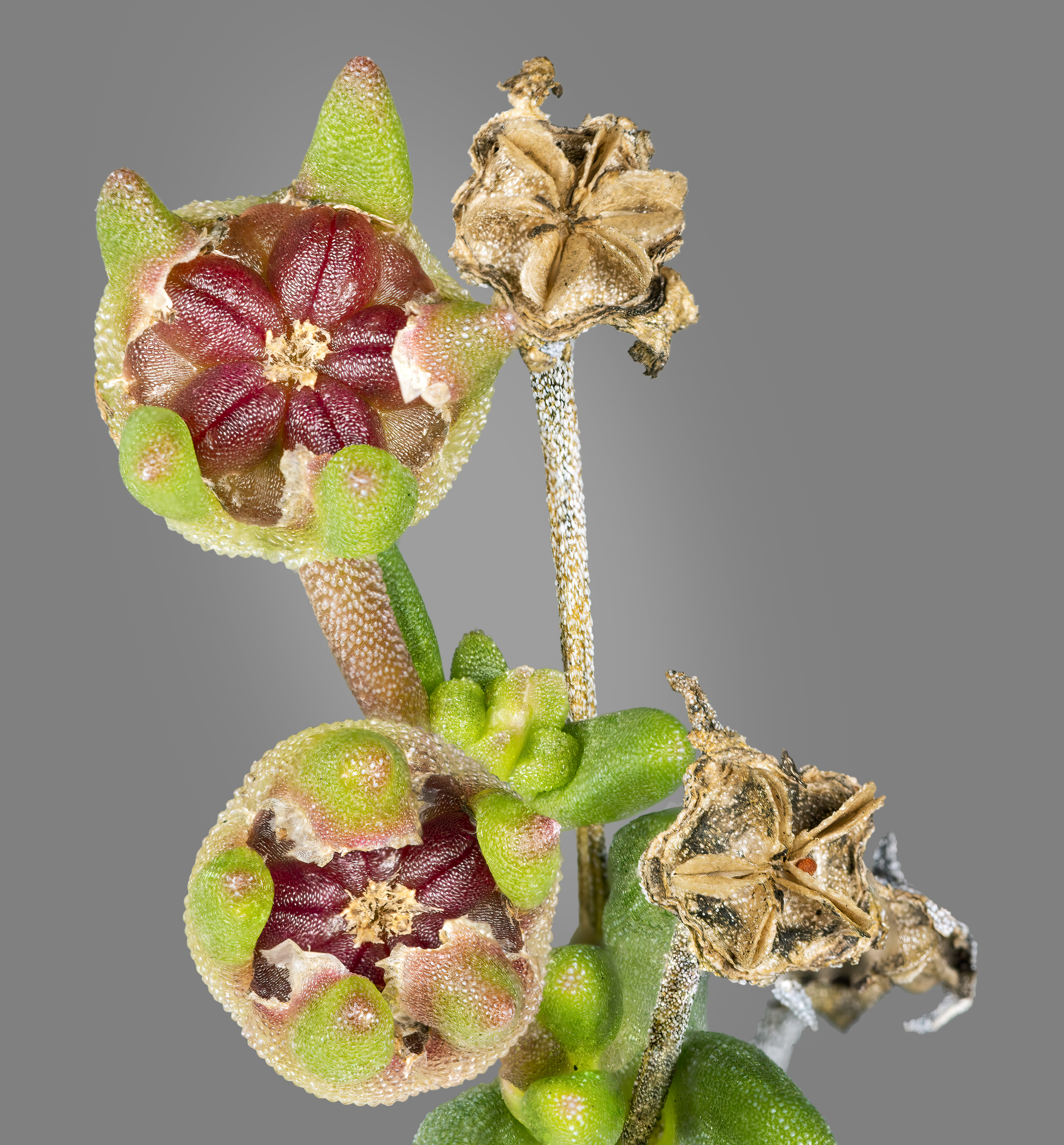
Fruit

== Cultivation and uses ==
It can be cultivated in a wide range of areas with a Mediterranean climate. Unlike many ice plants, this species is hardy to −20 °F (−29 °C), successfully overwintering at locations such as Denver, Colorado and Chicago, Illinois. The leaves turn red in cold winter temperatures. Due to the low need for maintenance, it is suitable for urban environments and high temperature regions. It can often be found in large, extensive patches. The trailing stems also make it suitable for flowerpots and terraces.

Propagation can be accomplished by taking a flowerless cutting, stripping a couple of bottom leaves off, and then replanting in the same soil.

The plant contains the hallucinogen chemicals DMT and 5-MeO-DMT, which can be extracted from the leaves. The concentration of these chemicals varies over the year. The content of 5-MeO-DMT rises during the summer and the content of DMT instead rises during the winter.

In South Africa, Delosperma cooperi is used for preparation of khadi, an alcoholic wine. The plant's roots are known to be involved in the process of fermentation but the leaves are the important source for the production of khadi. There is no scientific evidence behind claims of medicinal benefits. It is known that the interaction of the plant during the fermentation process results in chemical components to change, which converts sugar to oxalic acid and is extremely toxic when ingested.

The plant is also used among the Bantu and the Europeans as yeast source for making beer.

== Sources ==
- Leistner, O. A. (ed.). 2000. Seed plants of southern Africa: families and genera. Strelitzia 10. National Botanical Institute, Pretoria.
- Smith, G. F.; Chesselet, P.; Van Jaarsveld, E. J.; Hartmann, H.; Hammer, S.; Van Wyk, B.-E.; Burgoyne, P.; Klak, C.; & Kurzweil, H. 1998. Mesembs of the world. Briza Publications, Pretoria.
