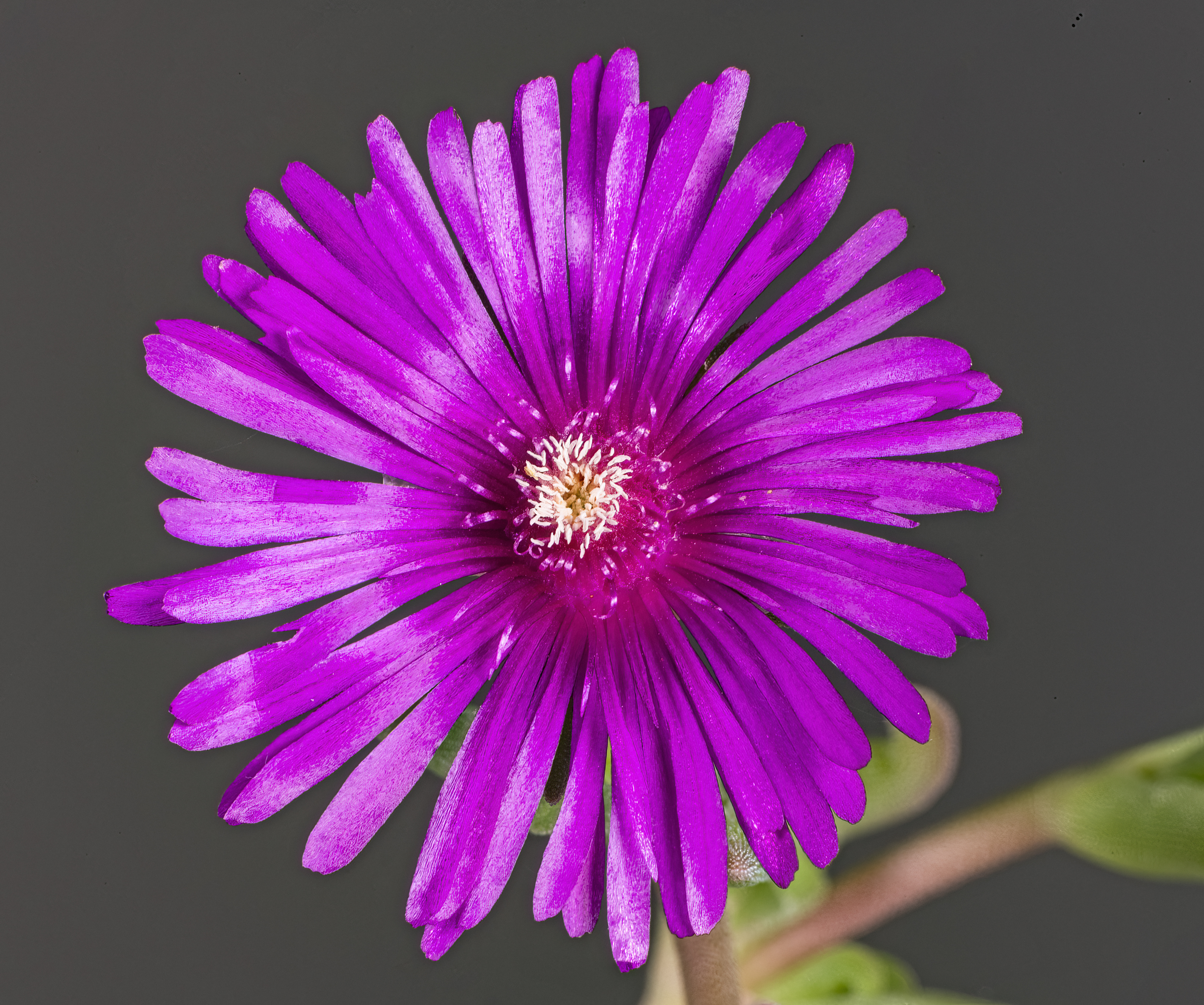
- Delosperma cooperi

Scientific classification
- Kingdom: Plantae
- Clade: Tracheophytes
- Clade: Angiosperms
- Clade: Eudicots
- Order: Caryophyllales
- Family: Aizoaceae
- Subfamily: Ruschioideae
- Tribe: Ruschieae
- Genus: Delosperma; N.E.Br.

Diversity
- c. 170 species
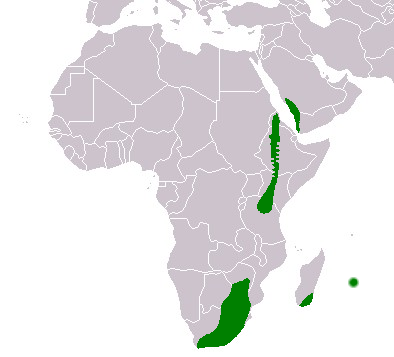
- range of the genus

Synonyms
- Corpuscularia Schwantes; Daggodora S.A.Hammer; Ectotropis N.E.Br.; Komsbergella Niederle; Sanianthos Niederle; Schonlandia L.Bolus

= Delosperma =

Genus of succulents

Delosperma ('delos'=evident, 'sperma'=seed) is a genus of around 170 species of succulent plants, formerly included in Mesembryanthemum in the family Aizoaceae. It was defined by English botanist N. E. Brown in 1925. The genus is common in southern and eastern Africa, with a few species in Madagascar, Reunion island, Yemen and Saudi Arabia. Delosperma species, as do most Aizoaceae, have hygrochastic capsules, opening and closing as they wet and dry.

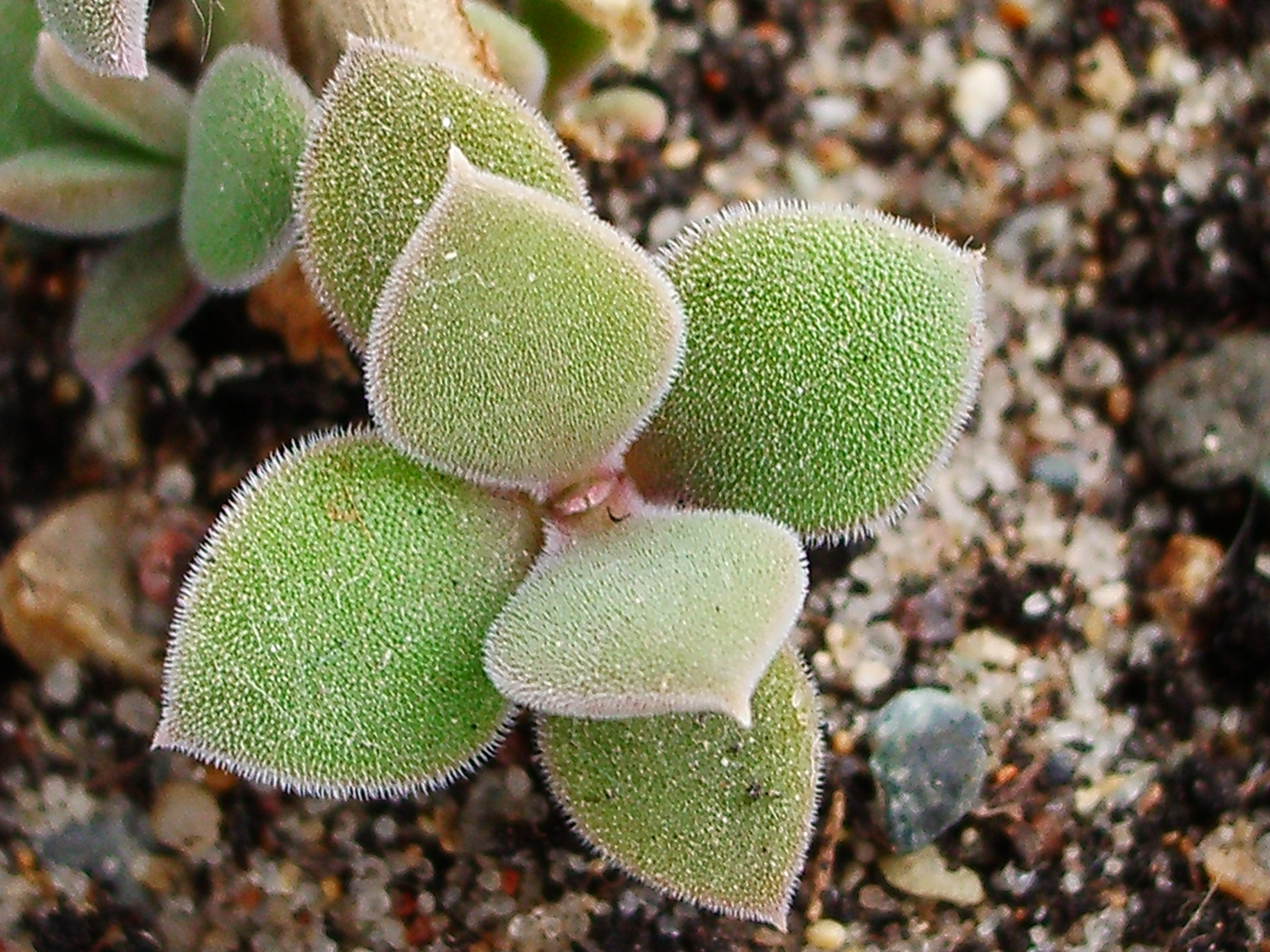
The leaves of Delosperma jansei (tradescantioides?)

== Distinguishing characters ==
Plants of the genus Delosperma can be distinguished by their seed capsules. When these open (in response to rain), the seeds are exposed and not covered by a protective membrane, like those of most other plants in the family. The membrane is sometimes reduced to just a ledge (a feature shared by the related genus Trichodiadema. The triangular valves, which open outwards when wet, each have distinctive wings on either side.

Delosperma leaves tend to be grooved or covered in bladder cells, which are sometimes even extended into hairs. The leaf shape is cylindrical or sometimes flattened.

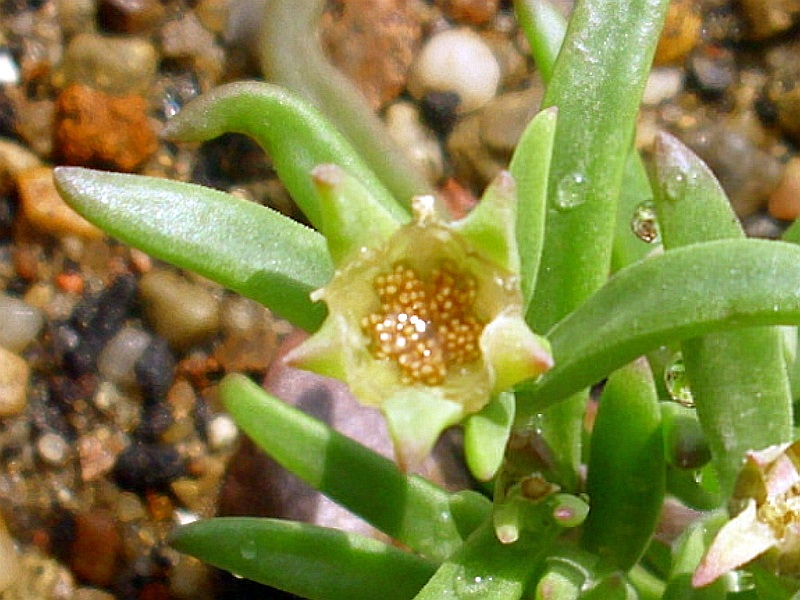
When the valves of their seed capsules open, the seeds of Delosperma are exposed, and not covered by any membrane or covering.

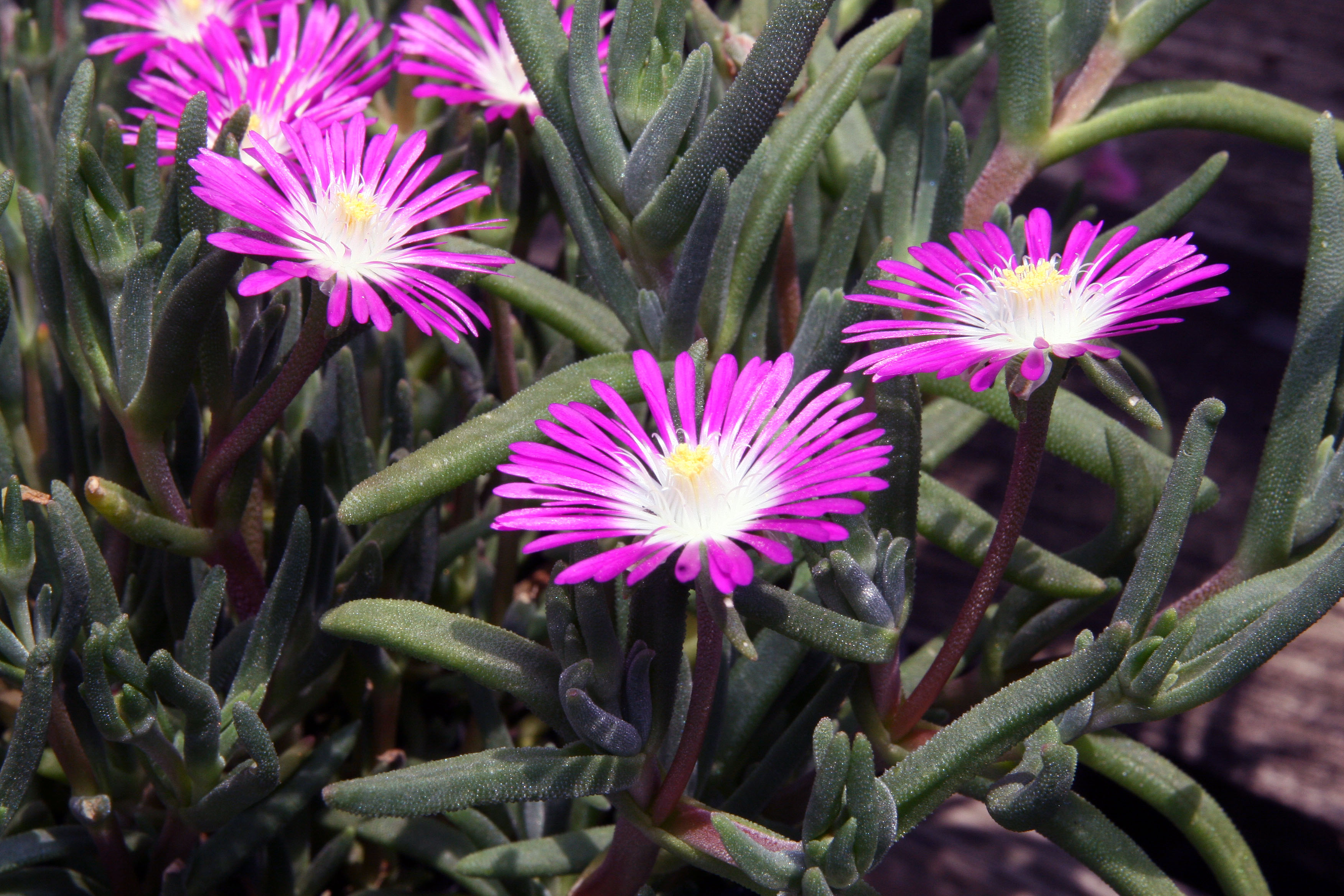
Delosperma floribundum leaves showing bladder cells typical of this genus

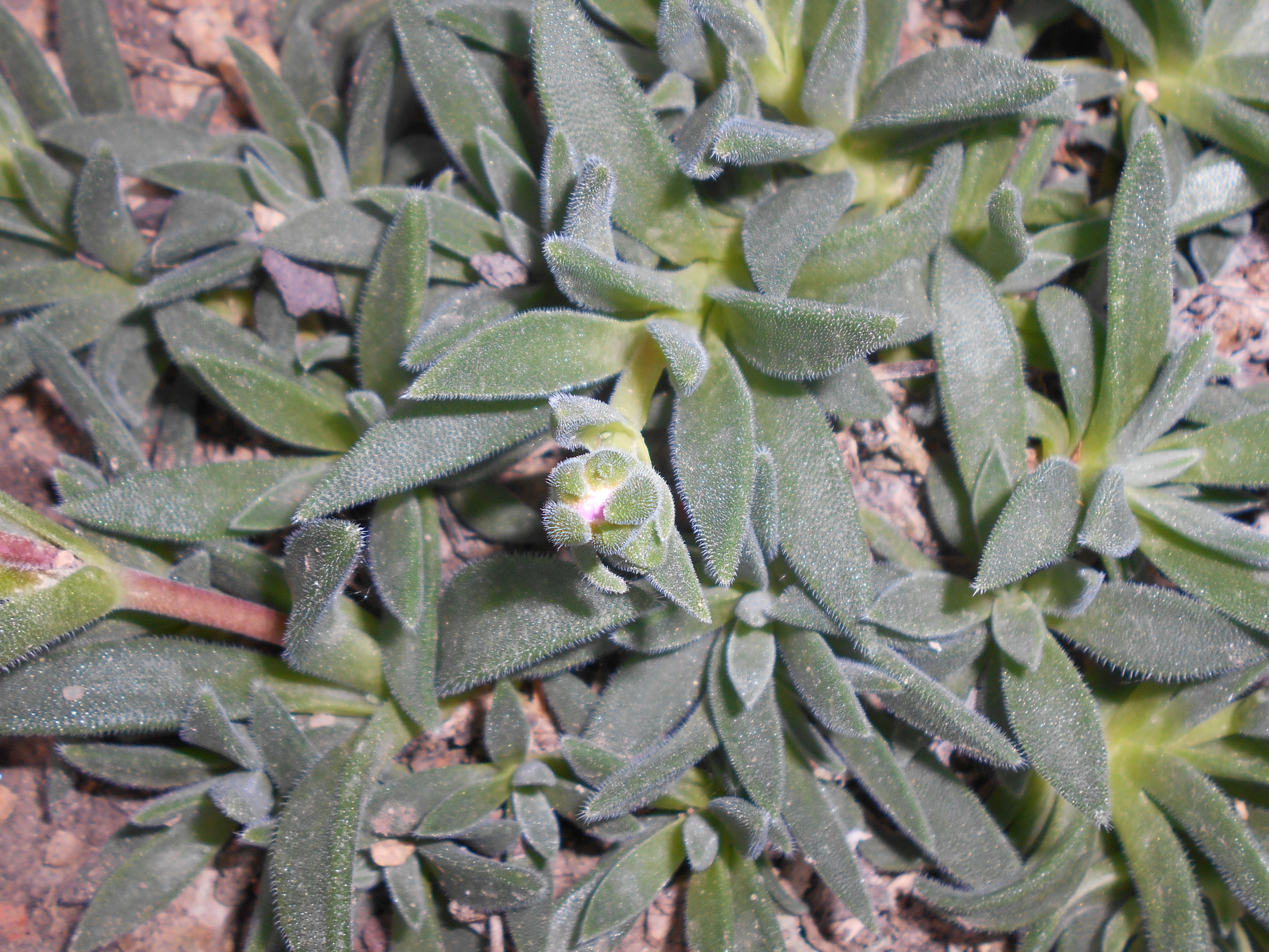
The bladder cells of Delosperma sutherlandii are elongated into fine hairs

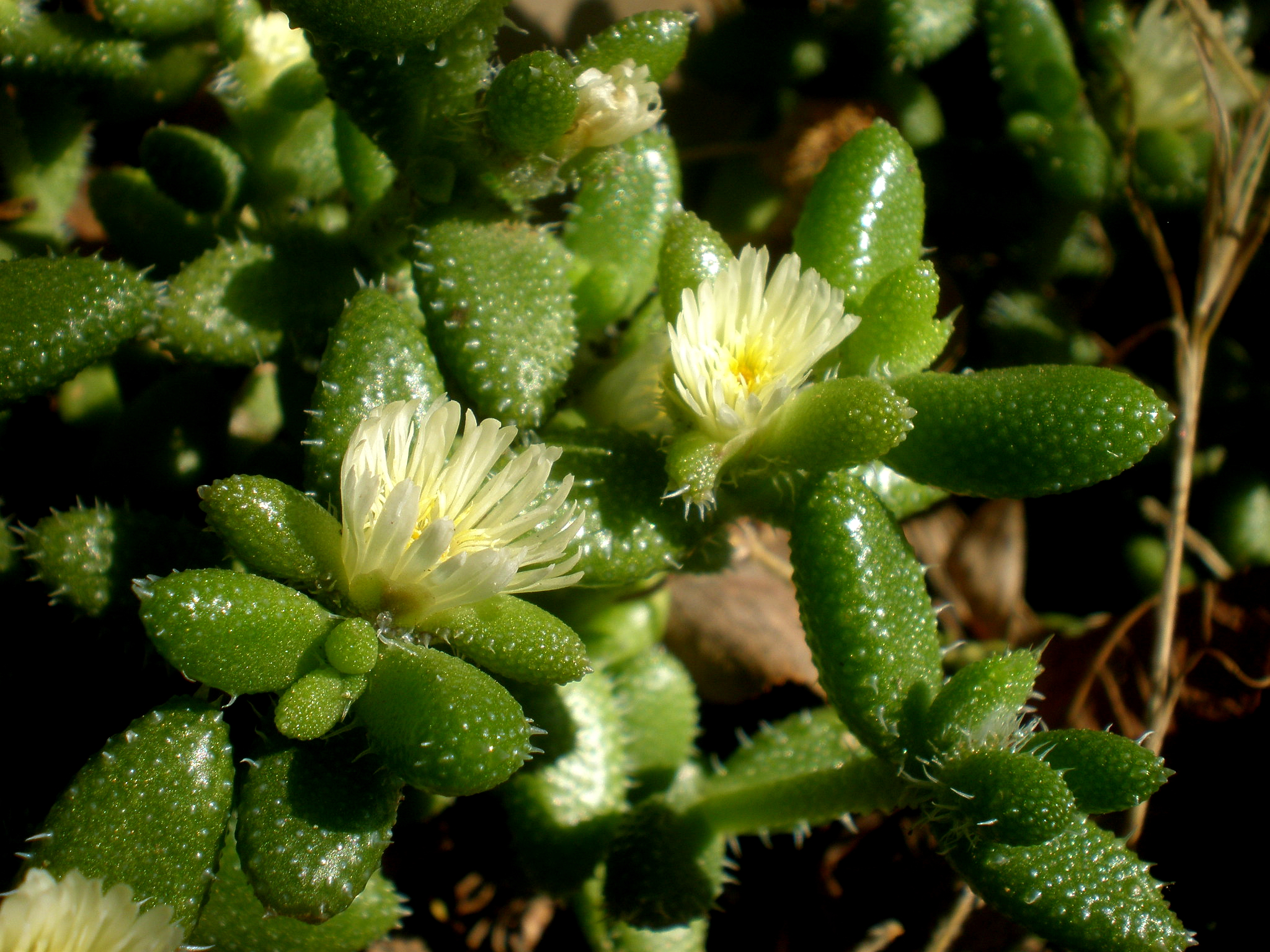
The bladder cells of Delosperma pruinosum are extended into thicker hairs.

Delosperma species are long-lived, and flower mostly in the summer. Their flowers vary greatly in colour.

== Selected species ==
Species include:

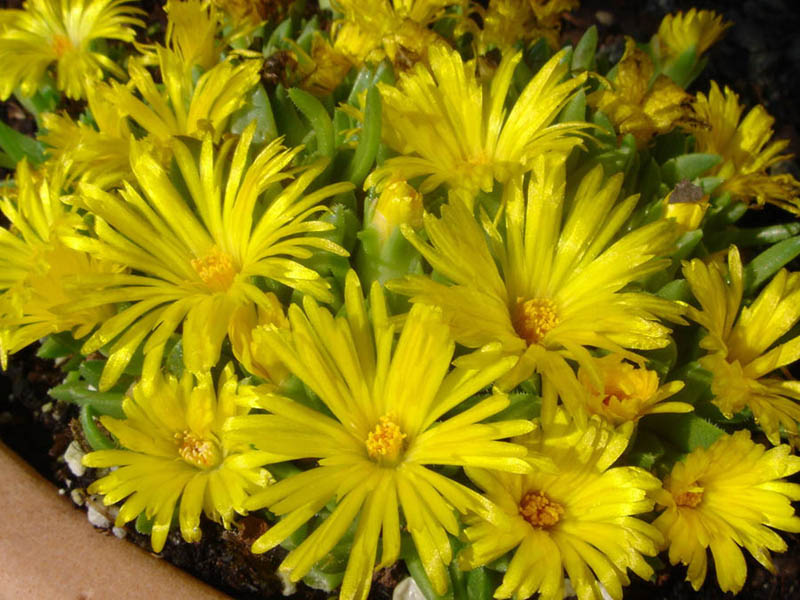
Delosperma basuticum

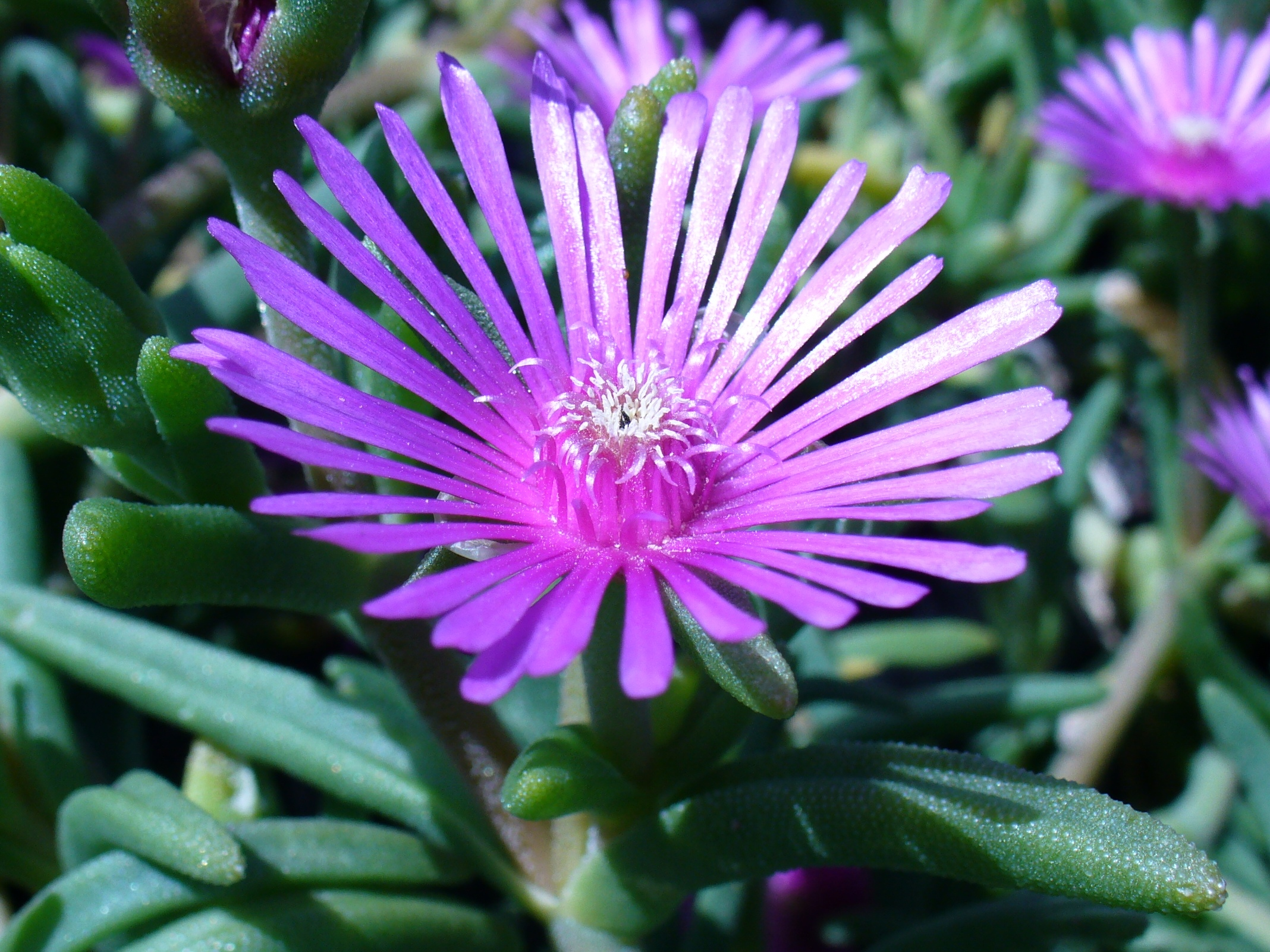
Delosperma lydenburgense leaves are grooved

- Delosperma aberdeenense
- Delosperma cooperi
- Delosperma echinatum
- Delosperma lavisiae – AGM
- Delosperma lehmannii
- Delosperma napiforme
- Delosperma sutherlandii
