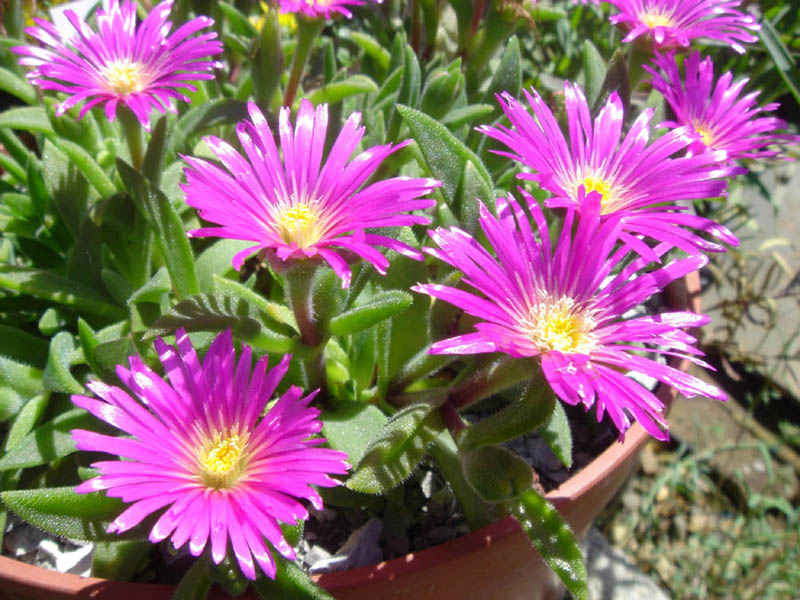

Scientific classification
- Kingdom: Plantae
- Clade: Tracheophytes
- Clade: Angiosperms
- Clade: Eudicots
- Order: Caryophyllales
- Family: Aizoaceae
- Genus: Delosperma
- Species: D. sutherlandii

Binomial name
- Delosperma sutherlandii (Hook.f.) N.E.Br.

= Delosperma sutherlandii =

Species of plant

Delosperma sutherlandii is a dwarf perennial plant, native to South Africa (KwaZulu-Natal, Gauteng, Mpumalanga, Limpopo, North West Province). It forms a dense lawn with abundant, long-lasting flowering. It will reach sizes of 60 cm in diameter and approximately 10–15 cm tall, with possibly the largest flowers of its type.

== Cultivation and uses ==
It can be cultivated in a wide range of areas with a Mediterranean climate.

This plant is also in a lot of collections, where cultivation is done with them on a regular basis.

== Sources ==
- Media related to Delosperma sutherlandii at Wikimedia Commons
