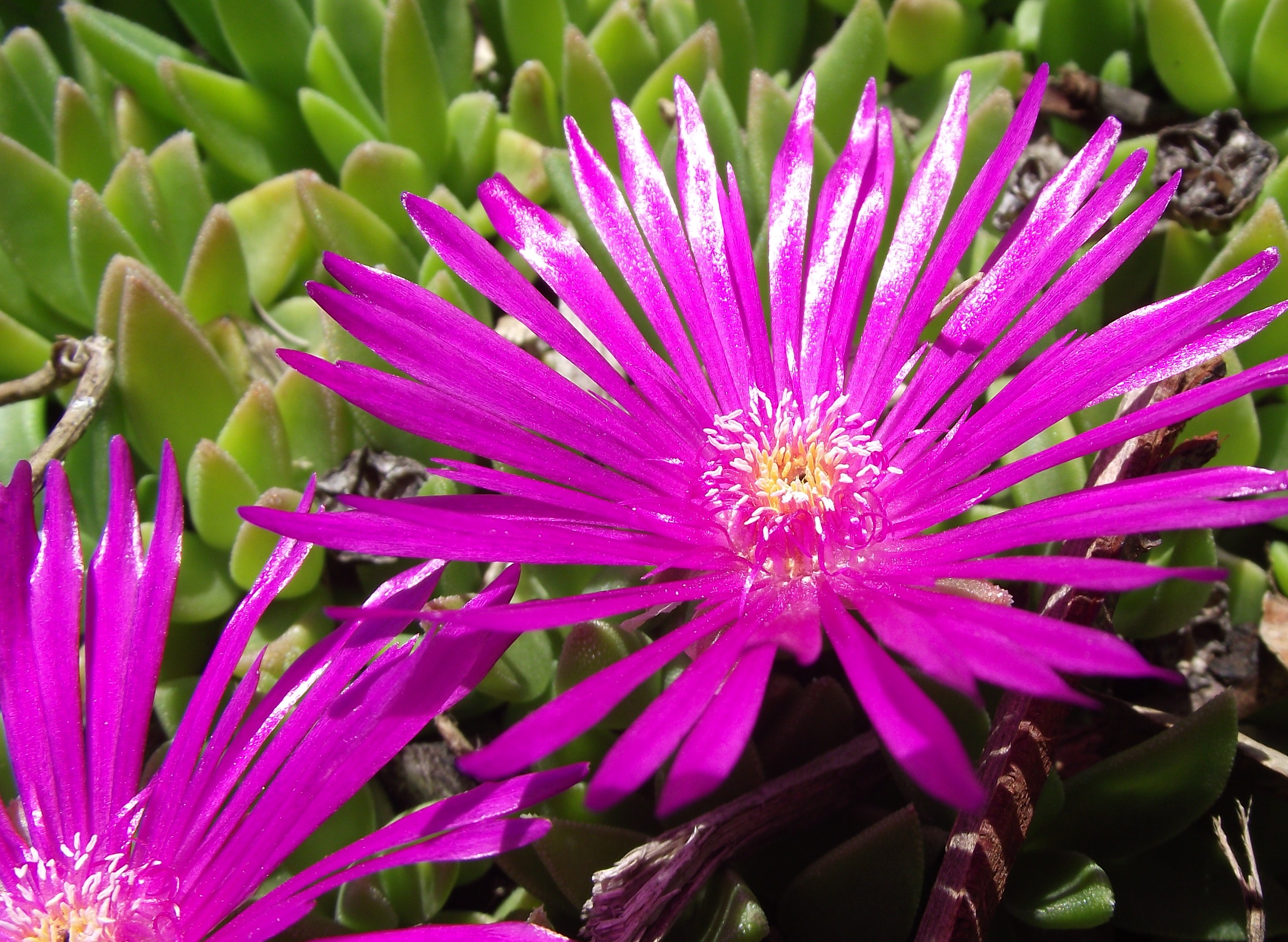
- In bloom

Scientific classification
- Kingdom: Plantae
- Clade: Embryophytes
- Clade: Tracheophytes
- Clade: Angiosperms
- Clade: Eudicots
- Order: Caryophyllales
- Family: Aizoaceae
- Genus: Delosperma
- Species: D. lavisiae

Binomial name
- Delosperma lavisiae L.Bolus

= Delosperma lavisiae =

Species of flowering plant

Delosperma lavisiae is a species of flowering plant in the family Aizoaceae, native to South Africa (Free State and KwaZulu-Natal) and Lesotho. It goes by a number of common names relating to its habitat, growing as high as 2,650 m (8,700 ft) up in the Drakensberg mountains; Drakensberg ice plant, Drakensberg vygie, and mountain vygie. A mat‑forming, cold hardy succulent, able to withstand occasional frosts as low as −20 to −15 °C (−4 to 5 °F), it has gained the Royal Horticultural Society's Award of Garden Merit.
