= KH-001 =

Clinical data
- Other names: KH001
- Routes of administration: Oral
- Drug class: Atypical serotonin reuptake inhibitor; Phosphodiesterase inhibitor

Pharmacokinetic data
- Onset of action: 15–20 minutes (T_{max})
- Duration of action: <4 hours

KH-001 is an atypical serotonin reuptake inhibitor (SRI) and phosphodiesterase (PDE) inhibitor which is under development for the treatment of premature ejaculation. It is taken on-demand orally.

The drug is a purified alkaloid derived from the South African plant Sceletium tortuosum (kanna). It is said to be selective and to have high potency as a serotonin reuptake inhibitor and phosphodiesterase inhibitor. In addition, KH-001 has atypical properties as a serotonin reuptake inhibitor, including a rapid onset of therapeutic effectiveness rather than requiring chronic administration. KH-001 has been found to increase latency to ejaculation in male rats treated acutely with para-chloroamphetamine (PCA) to induce ejaculation. The pharmacokinetics of KH-001 in humans have been studied. It showed a rapid onset and a short duration. The drug is described as a potential first-in-class medication.

KH-001 is under development by Kadence Bio (formerly Kanna Health). As of November 2024, it is in phase 1 clinical trials. Phase 2 trials were planned to begin in 2025. The chemical structure of KH-001 does not yet appear to have been disclosed. However, Kanna Health patented synthetic analogues of mesembrine with activity as serotonin reuptake inhibitors in 2023, with KH-001 being indicated as one of the compounds in the patent.

== See also ==
- List of investigational sexual dysfunction drugs
- List of investigational hallucinogens and entactogens
- Sceletium tortuosum (kanna) and mesembrine
- SNTX-2643 (SENS-01)
