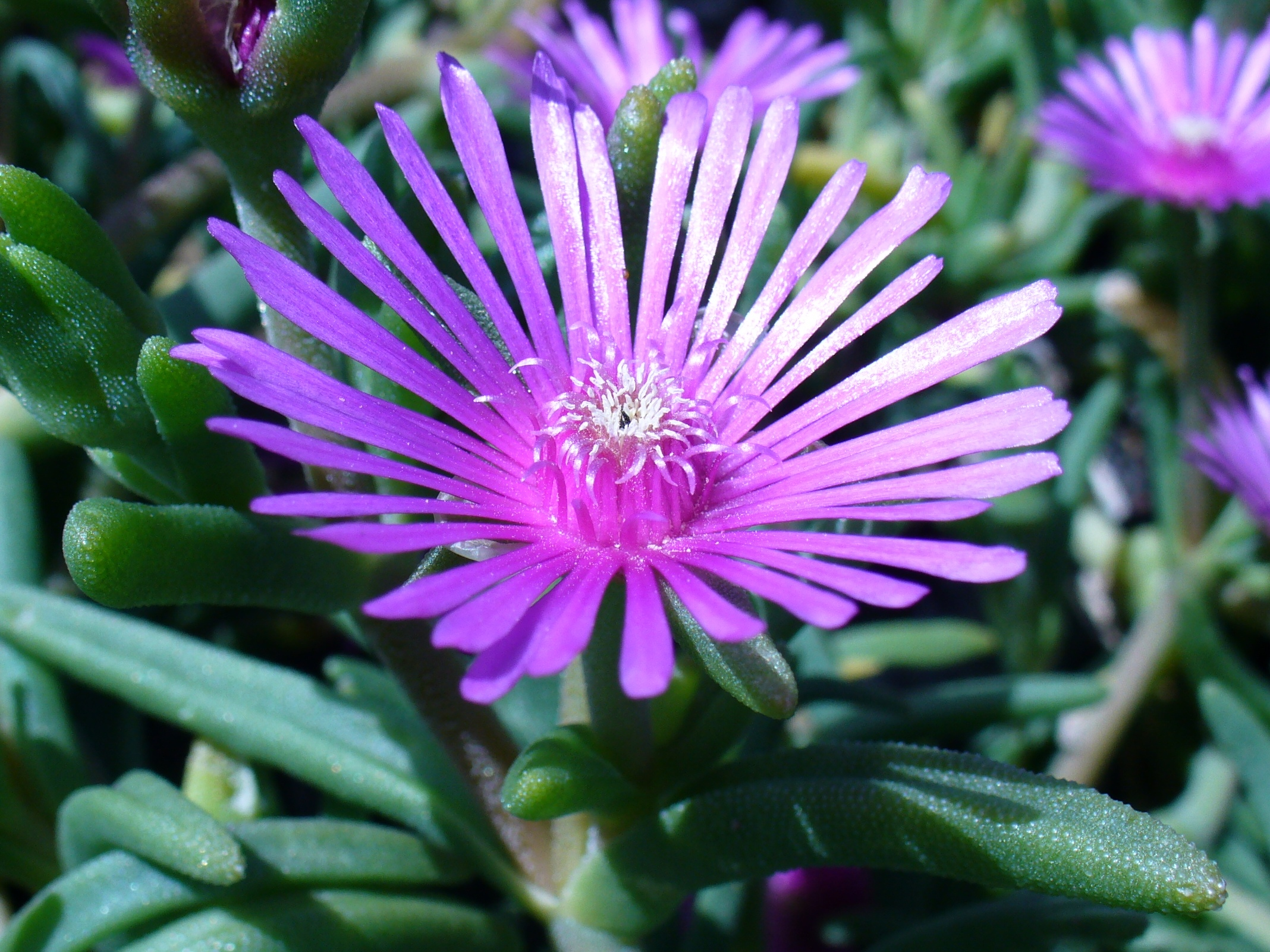

Scientific classification
- Kingdom: Plantae
- Clade: Tracheophytes
- Clade: Angiosperms
- Clade: Eudicots
- Order: Caryophyllales
- Family: Aizoaceae
- Genus: Delosperma
- Species: D. lydenburgense

Binomial name
- Delosperma lydenburgense L.Bolus

= Delosperma lydenburgense =

Species of flowering plant

Delosperma lydenburgense, commonly known as the Lydenburg vygie, klipvygie, or rotsvygie, is a perennial succulent belonging to the Aizoaceae family. The species is endemic to Mpumalanga.
