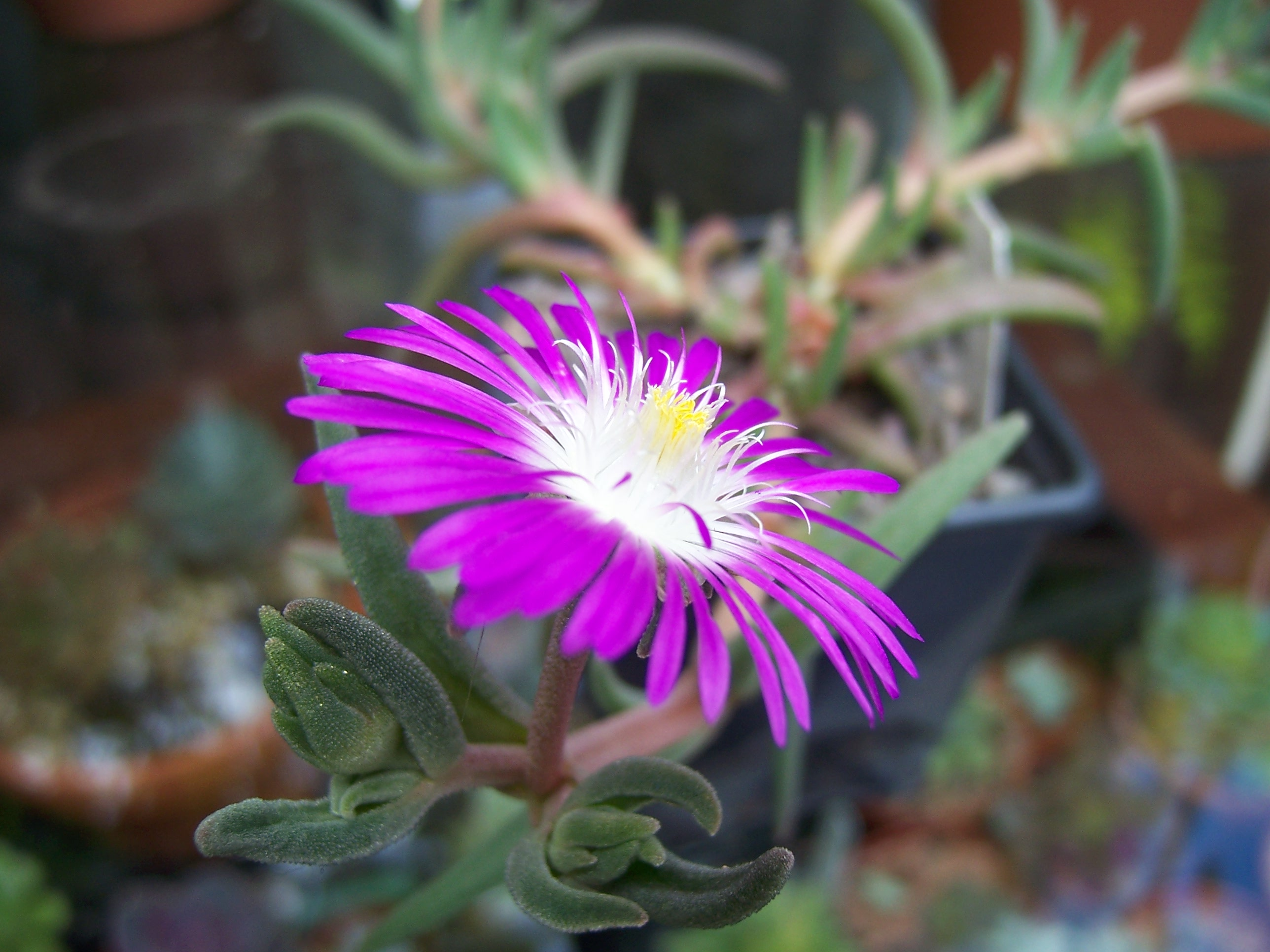

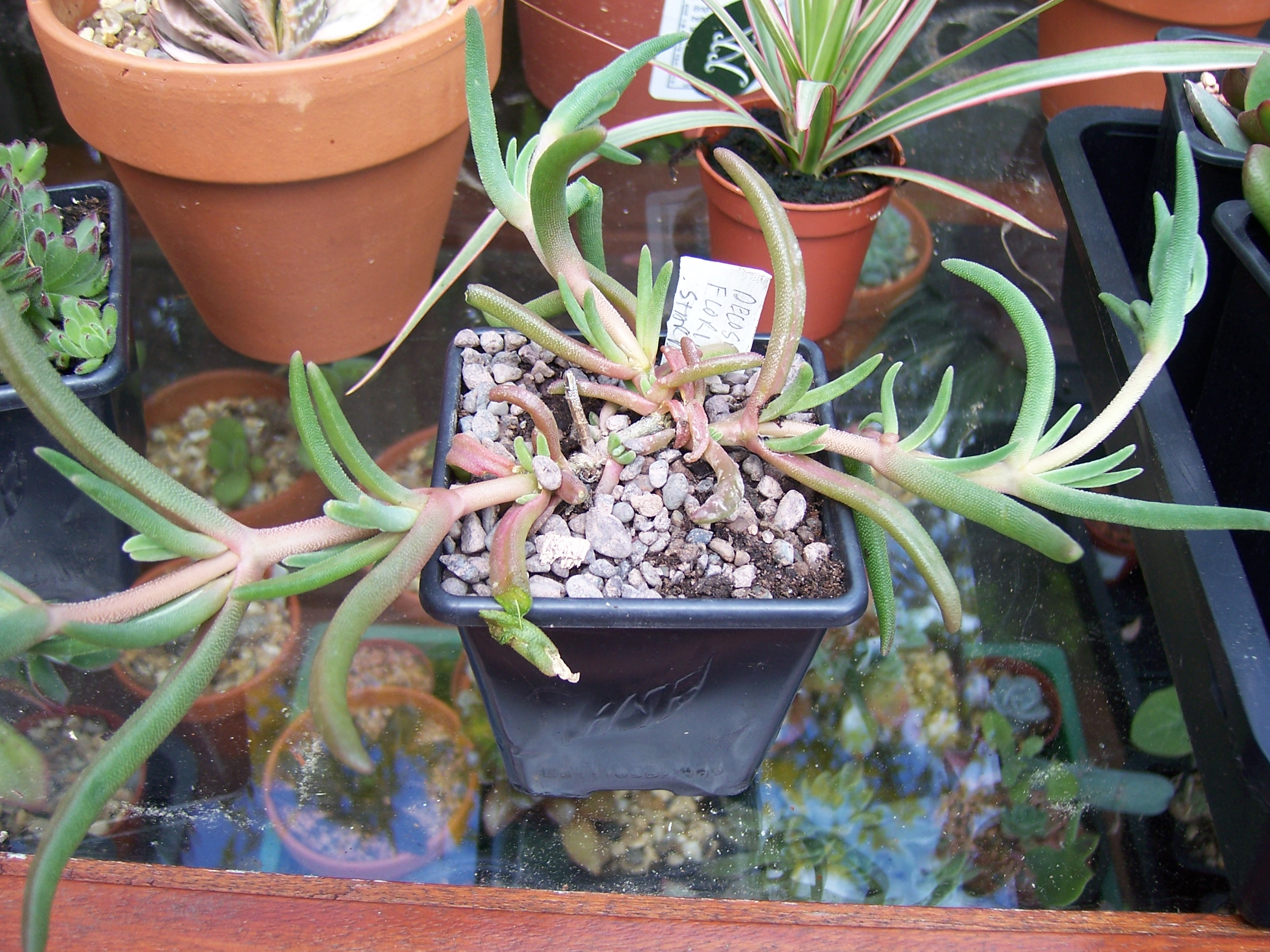

Scientific classification
- Kingdom: Plantae
- Clade: Tracheophytes
- Clade: Angiosperms
- Clade: Eudicots
- Order: Caryophyllales
- Family: Aizoaceae
- Genus: Delosperma
- Species: D. floribundum

Binomial name
- Delosperma floribundum L.Bolus

= Delosperma floribundum =

Species of flowering plant

Delosperma floribundum, commonly known as the ice plant or skaapvygie, is a perennial succulent belonging to the Aizoaceae family. The species is endemic to KwaZulu-Natal and the Free State.
