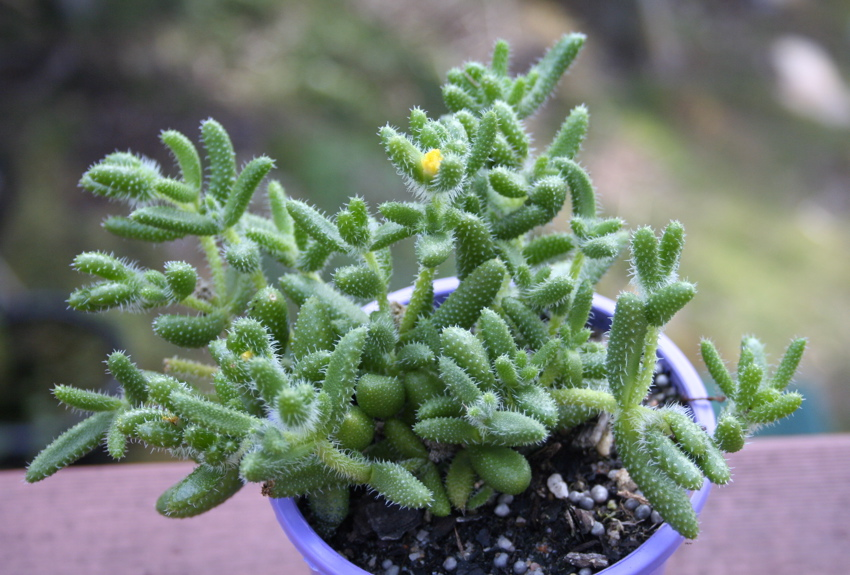

Scientific classification
- Kingdom: Plantae
- Clade: Tracheophytes
- Clade: Angiosperms
- Clade: Eudicots
- Order: Caryophyllales
- Family: Aizoaceae
- Genus: Delosperma
- Species: D. echinatum

Binomial name
- Delosperma echinatum (Lam.) Schwantes

Synonyms
- Drosanthemum pruinosum (Thunb.) Schwantes; Mesembryanthemum echinatum Lam.

= Delosperma echinatum =

Species of succulent

Delosperma echinatum is a succulent plant, native to South Africa. It is also known as the pickle plant. The new genus Delosperma was erected by English botanist N. E. Brown in 1925, with this species later acknowledged as the type species.

Scottish plant-hunter Francis Masson collected this species for Kew Gardens in 1774. French naturalist Jean-Baptiste Lamarck described it as Mesembryanthemum echinatum in 1786, from material in France that most likely had come from England.

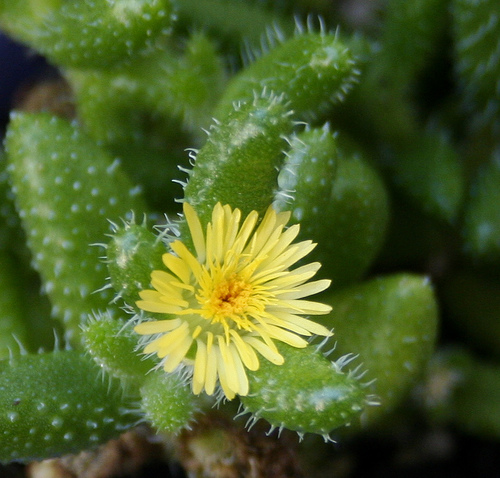
A flower on D. echinatum
