= Mesembrine =

Chemical compound

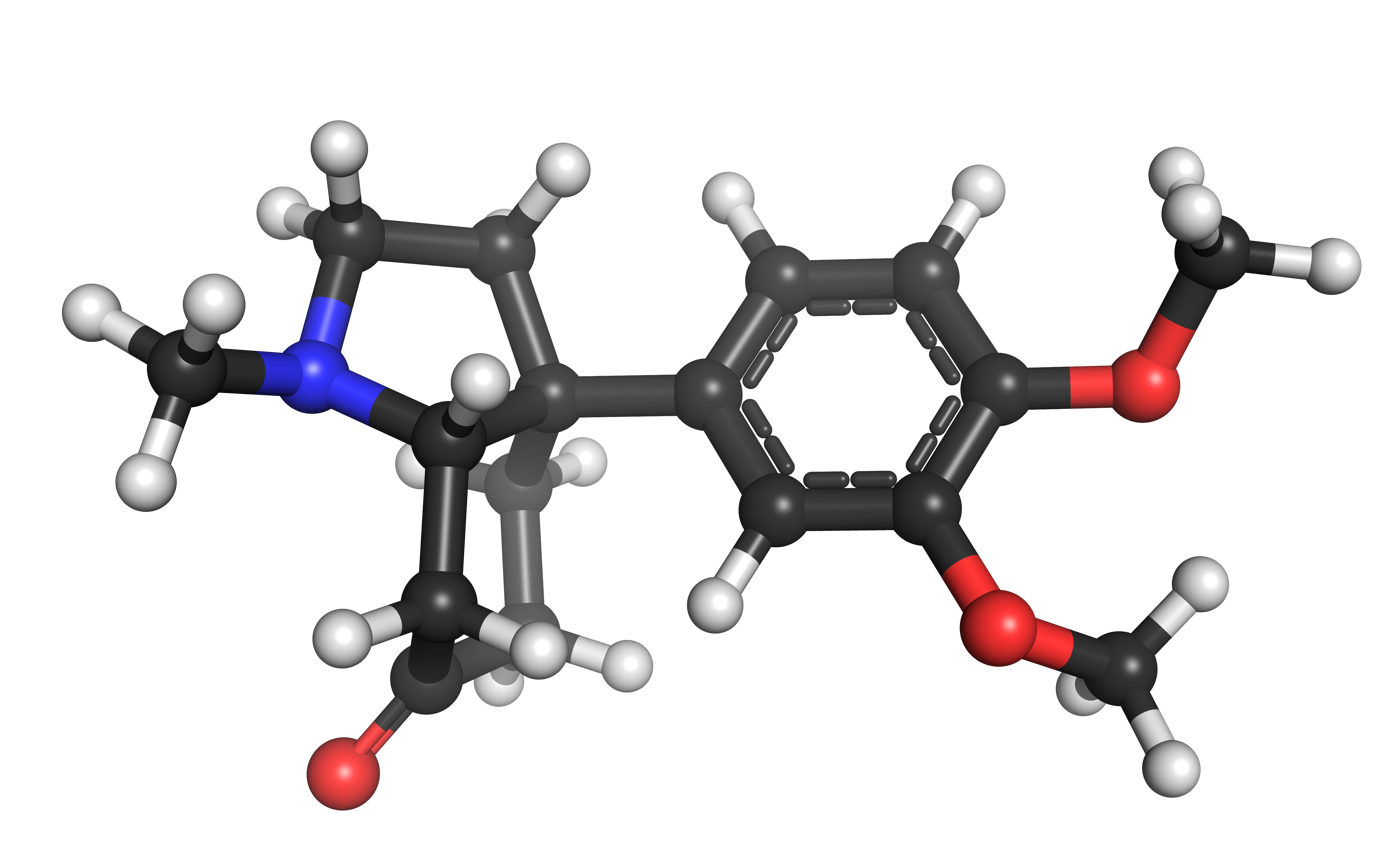
- Above: molecular structure of mesembrine Below: 3D representation of a mesembrine molecule

Clinical data
- Drug class: Serotonin reuptake inhibitor; PDE4 inhibitor
- ATC code: None

Legal status
- Legal status: US: Unscheduled

Identifiers
- IUPAC name: (3aS,7aS)-3a-(3,4-Dimethoxyphenyl)-1-methyl-2,3,4,5,7,7a-hexahydroindol-6-one
- CAS Number: 468-53-1
- PubChem CID: 394162
- ChemSpider: 349381
- UNII: P5X28MLQ1Z
- CompTox Dashboard (EPA): DTXSID50947774

Chemical and physical data
- Formula: C_{17}H_{23}NO_{3}
- Molar mass: 289.375 g·mol^{−1}
- 3D model (JSmol): Interactive image
- SMILES: CN1CC[C@@]2([C@H]1CC(=O)CC2)C3=CC(=C(C=C3)OC)OC
- InChI: InChI=1S/C17H23NO3/c1-18-9-8-17(7-6-13(19)11-16(17)18)12-4-5-14(20-2)15(10-12)21-3/h4-5,10,16H,6-9,11H2,1-3H3/t16-,17-/m1/s1; Key:DAHIQPJTGIHDGO-IAGOWNOFSA-N

Mesembrine is an alkaloid found within Sceletium tortuosum, commonly known as kanna. This compound is noted for its psychoactive properties, particularly as a serotonin reuptake inhibitor (SRI), which contributes to its potential use in treating mood disorders and anxiety. Mesembrine has garnered interest in both traditional medicine and modern pharmacology, where it is explored for its effects on enhancing mood and cognitive function.

Kanna itself has a long history of use by indigenous peoples in Southern Africa, who utilized it for its mood-enhancing and stress-relieving effects, often consuming it in various forms such as teas or chews.

Mesembrine has also been identified in Mesembryanthemum cordifolium, Delosperma echinatum, and Oscularia deltoides.

== Pharmacology ==
Mesembrine has been shown to act as a serotonin reuptake inhibitor (K_{i} = 1.4 nM), and has also been found to behave as a weak inhibitor of the enzyme phosphodiesterase 4 (PDE4) (K_{i} = 7,800 nM). A concentrated mesembrine extract of Sceletium tortuosum may exert antidepressant effects by acting as a monoamine releasing agent. As such, mesembrine likely plays a dominant role in the antidepressant effects of kanna.

Rat studies have evaluated effects of kanna extract, finding analgesic and antidepressant potential. No adverse results were noted for a commercial extract up to 5000 mg/kg daily in rats.

== Structure ==
Mesembrine was first isolated and characterized in 1957. It is a tricyclic molecule with two bridgehead chiral carbons located between the five-membered and six-membered rings. The naturally occurring form of mesembrine produced by plants is the levorotatory isomer, (−)-mesembrine, where the carbon atoms at positions 3a and 7a both have the S configuration (3aS,7aS).

== Total synthesis ==
Because of its structure and bioactivity, mesembrine has been a target for total synthesis over the past 40 years. Over 40 total syntheses have been reported for mesembrine, most of which focused on different approaches and strategies for the construction of the bicyclic ring system and the quaternary carbon.

Shamma's route for total synthesis of (±)-mesembrine

Yamada's asymmetric total synthesis of (+)-mesembrine

The first total synthesis of mesembrine was reported in 1965. This route has 21 steps, which was among the longest synthetic routes for mesembrine. Key steps involve the construction of the six-membered ketone ring by Diels–Alder reaction, α-allylation for synthesis of the quaternary carbon, and conjugate addition reaction for the final five-membered ring closure. The final product from this route is a racemic mixture of (+)- and (-)-mesembrine.

In 1971, the first asymmetric total synthesis of (+)-mesembrine was reported. This synthesis introduced the quaternary carbon atom through an asymmetric Robinson annulation reaction, which was mediated by a chiral auxiliary derived from L-proline. In the final step, an intramolecular aza-Michael addition produced the fused pyrrolidine ring system.

== See also ==
- SNTX-2643
- KH-001
